= Roji-en Japanese Gardens =

Gardens in Delray Beach, Florida, US

Coordinates: 26.42751°N 80.147385°W

The Roji-en: Garden of the Drops of Dew, The George D. and Harriet W. Cornell Japanese Gardens consists of six gardens representing different periods in the development of the Japanese garden. It occupies 16 acres (6.5 hectares) of the Morikami Museum and Japanese Gardens in Morikami Park in suburban Delray Beach, Florida, US. The gardens are open to the public, but closed Mondays and major holidays. Access to the gardens is included in the admission fee to the museum.

Today's gardens form one of the largest Japanese gardens in the world. They were designed by Hoichi Kurisu and constructed between 1999 and 2001 in Morikami Park, a 200-acre (80 hectare) site donated by George Morikami to Palm Beach County and Florida in 1973. The Roji-en gardens are part of the Morikami Museum and Japanese Gardens, reported to be the only museum in the United States dedicated to the living culture of Japan.

A survey conducted in 2004 by the Journal of Japanese Gardening ranked the Morikami gardens as the eighth highest-quality public Japanese garden in North America.

== The Six Gardens ==
A mile-long path leads through six different Japanese gardens, representing six periods of Japanese garden design between the eighth and 20th centuries. The grounds feature pine trees, bamboo groves, waterfalls and large granite boulders.

- Shinden Gardens Heian period (9th–12th centuries); aristocratic gardens patterned after Chinese gardens, featuring ponds and islands.
- Paradise Gardens (13th and 14th century); influenced by Buddhist teachings, and incorporating hills, ponds and islands. Similar to the Shinden Gardens but on a smaller scale.
- Early Rock Gardens – abstracted vegetation and water, with rock arrangements to represent waterfalls and streambeds.
- Late Rock Gardens – (15th century) karesansui gardens almost entirely constructed of gravel, stone and sand.
- Flat Gardens – (16th and 17th century) shakkei, or borrowed landscape.
- Modern Romantic Gardens – (Edo period and later) stroll gardens influenced by Western European gardens.

== Chie no Wa – Wisdom Ring ==
As one exits the Museum center to begin the tour, one encounters the Chie no Wa Wisdom Ring—a replica of a 500-year-old stone lantern in Miyazu, Delray Beach's sister city in Japan. The original Wisdom Ring, or Chie no Wa in Japanese, stands at a temple dedicated to the Buddhist deity of wisdom, Monju.

The citizens of Miyazu donated the replica in 1997 to commemorate Morikami Museum's 20th anniversary.

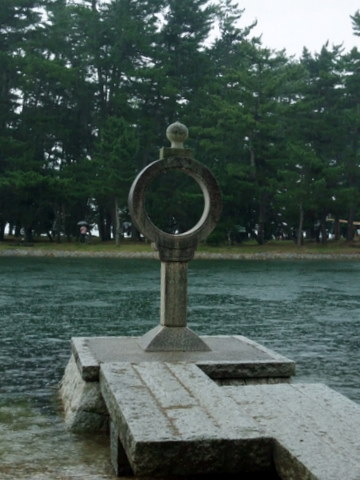
The wisdom ring in Miyasu

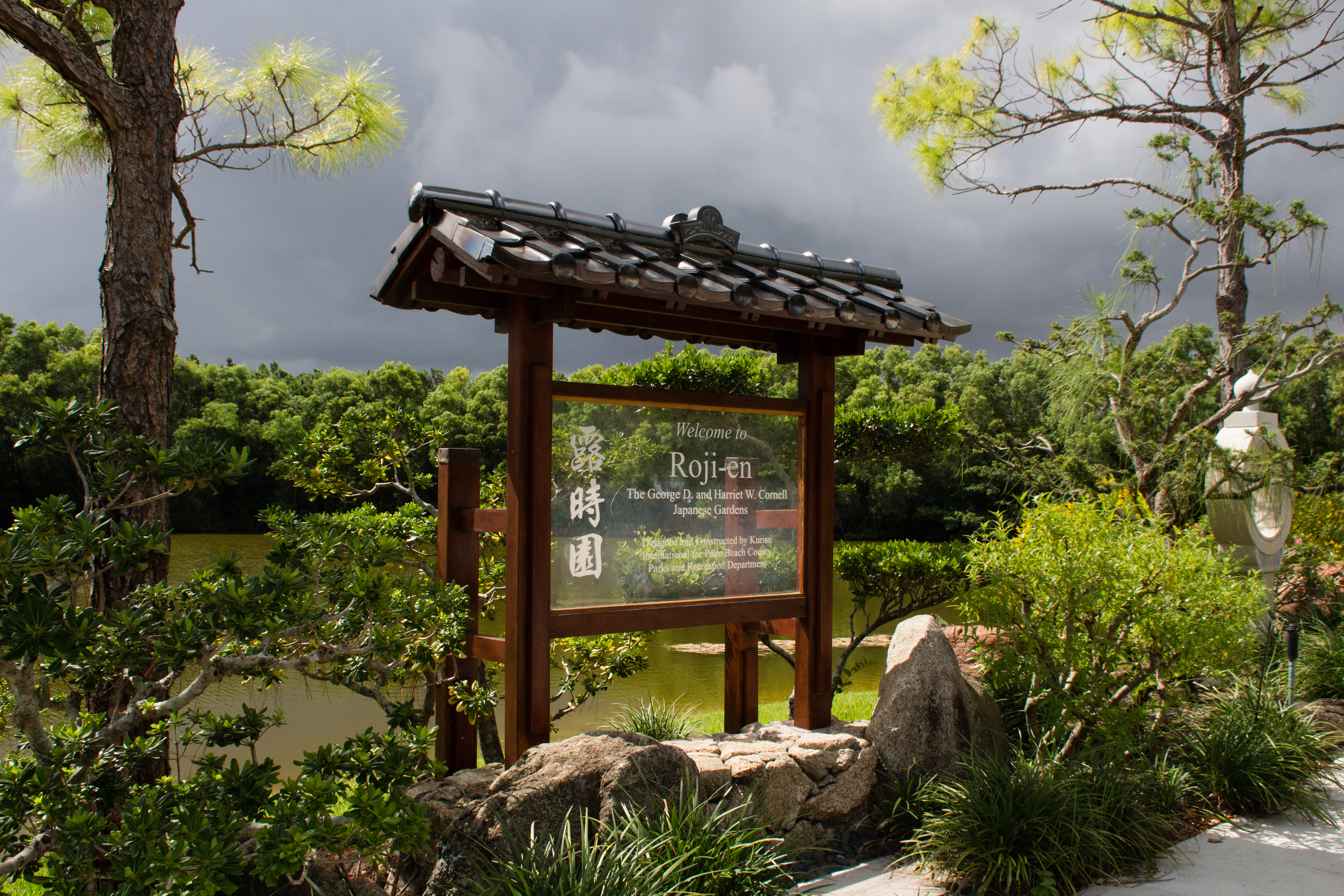
Wisdom Ring at the far right

== James and Hazel Gates Woodruff Memorial Bridge ==
The James and Hazel Gates Woodruff Memorial Bridge was erected by U.S. Naval commander James G. Woodruff, (a Pearl Harbor veteran) in memory of his wife, Hazel, a lover of Japanese gardens. The bridge stands at the entrance to the gardens and symbolizes the link between Japan and the state of Florida.

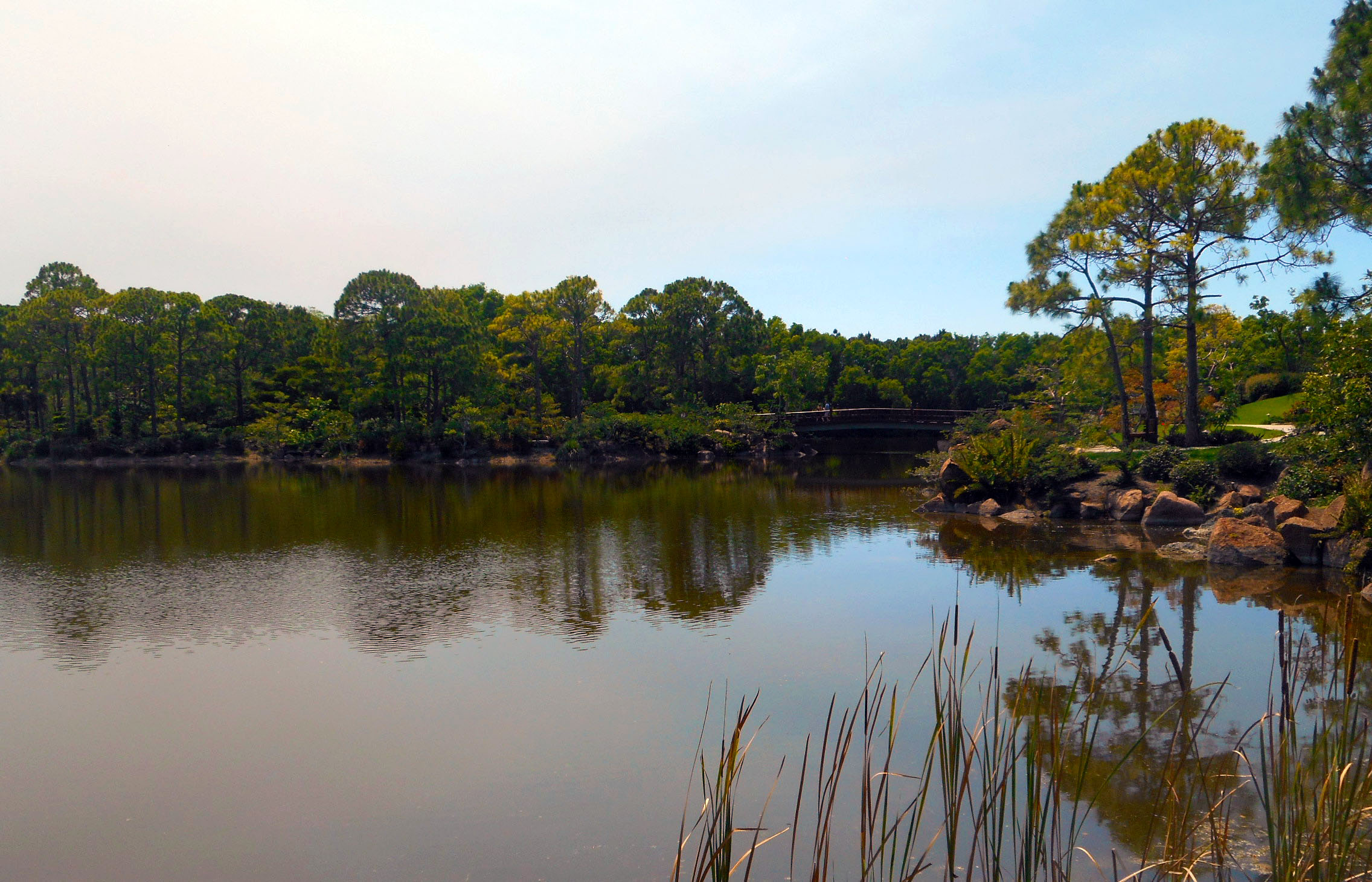
Lake, Islands and Bridge

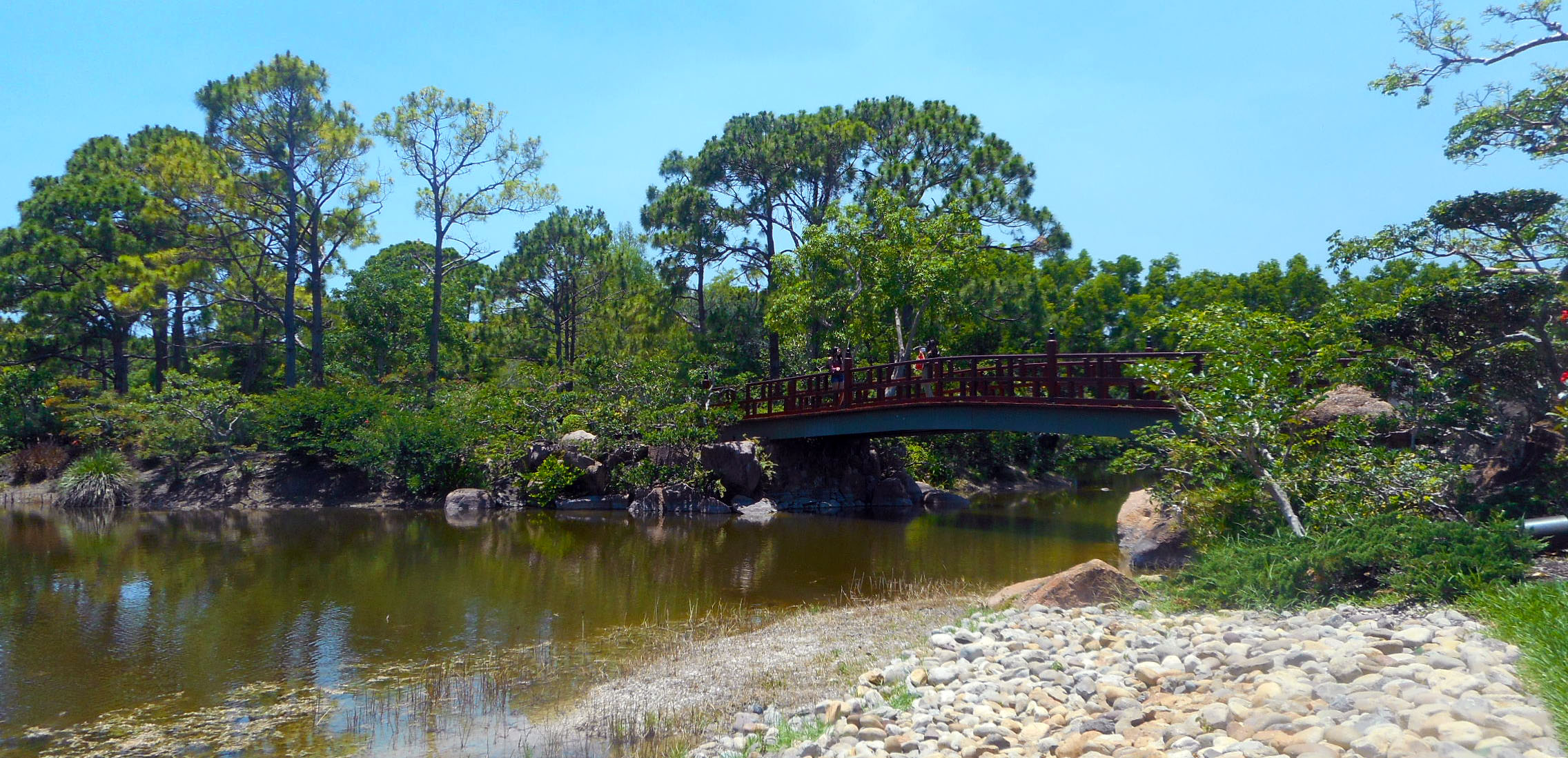
Shinden Garden Island and Bridge

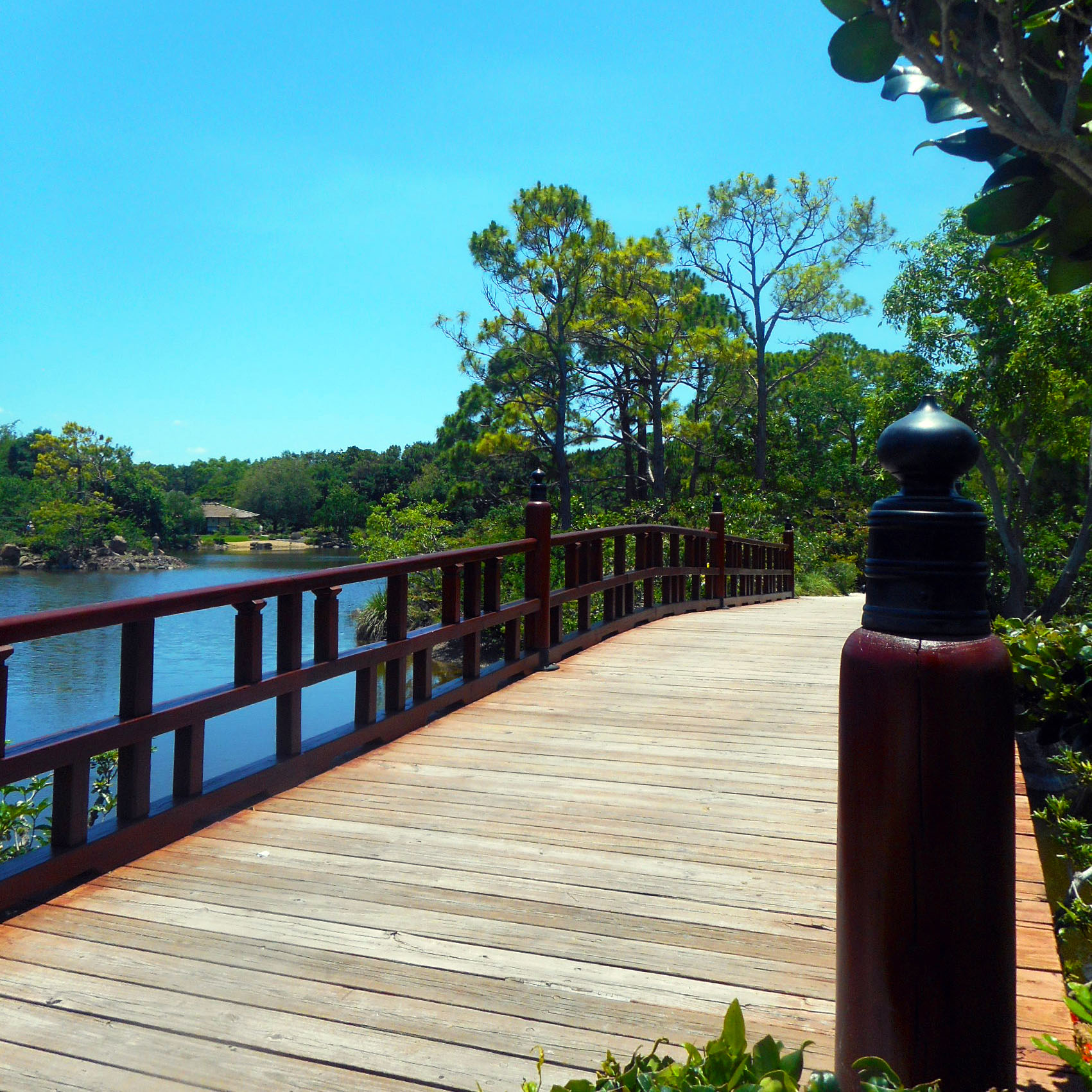
James and Hazel Gates Woodruff Memorial Bridge

== Shinden Garden ==
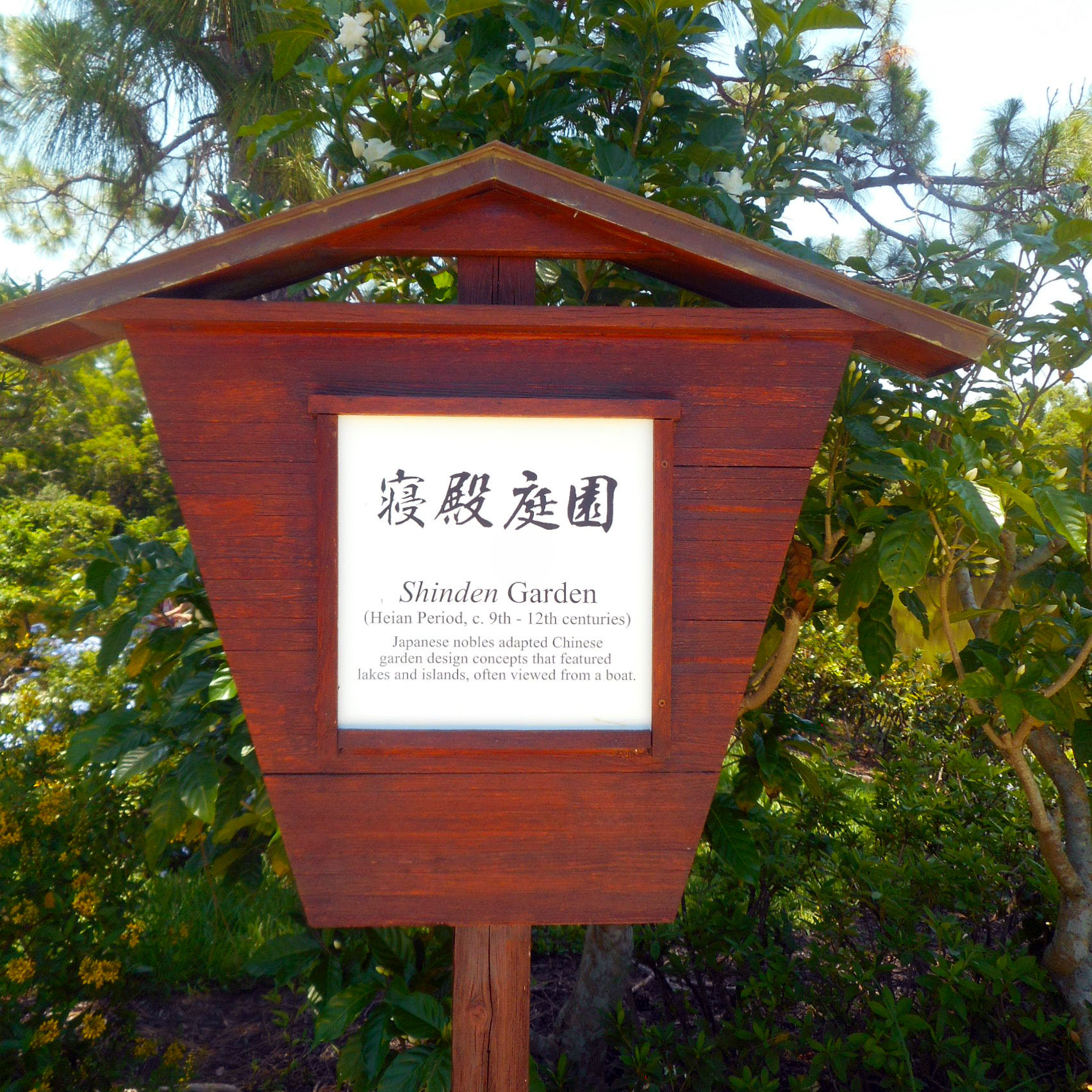
Shinden Garden Sign

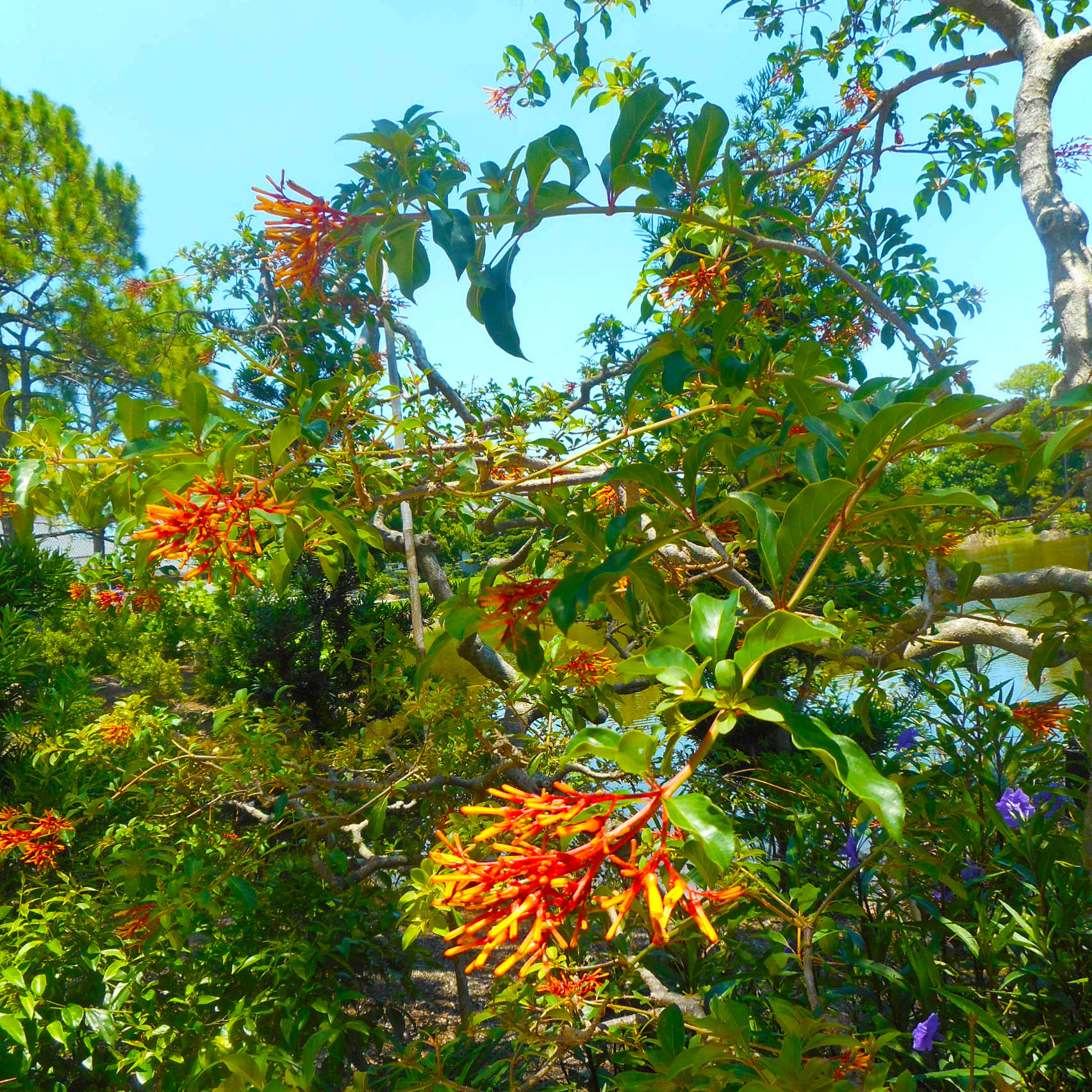
Flowering Plant

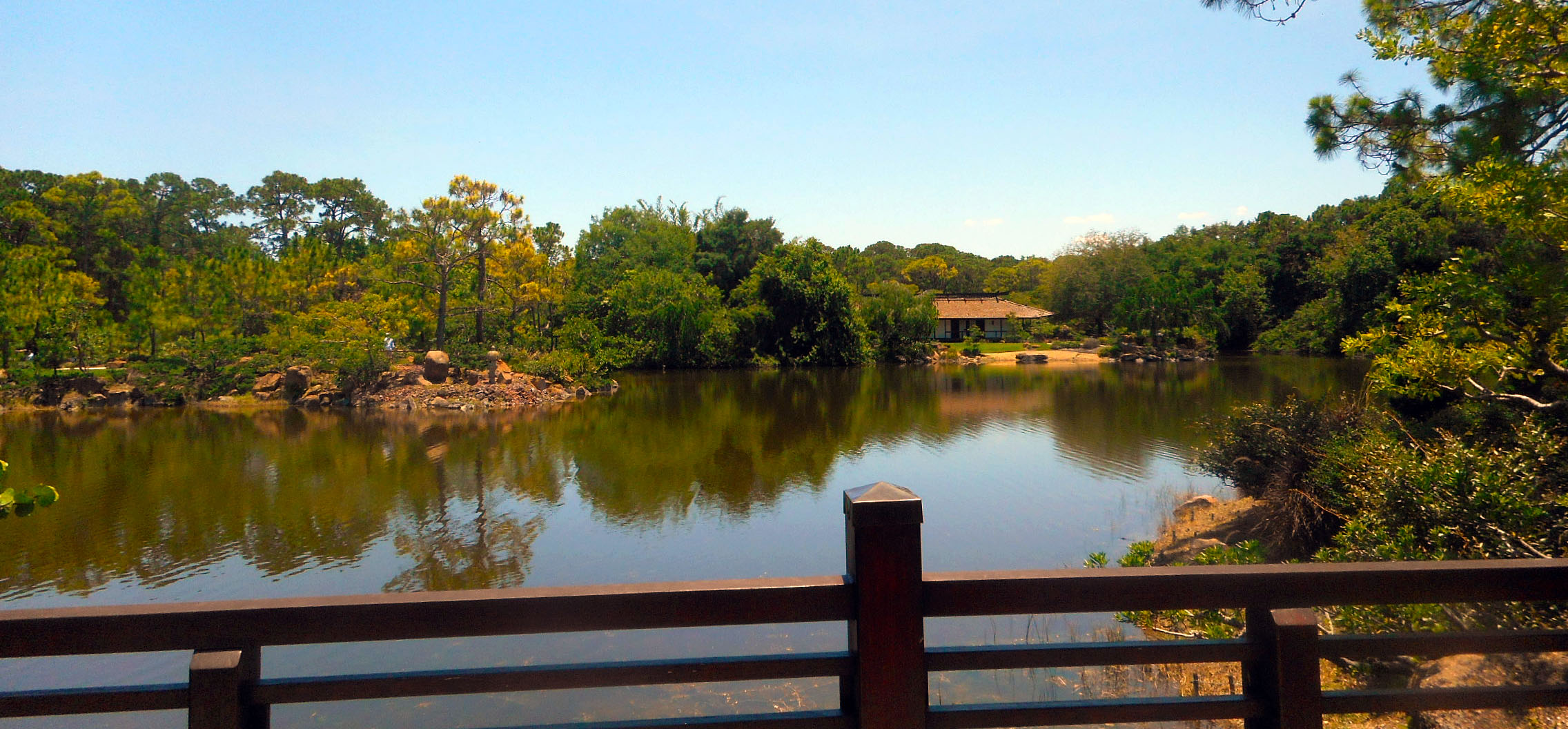
View of Japanese Tea House across lake

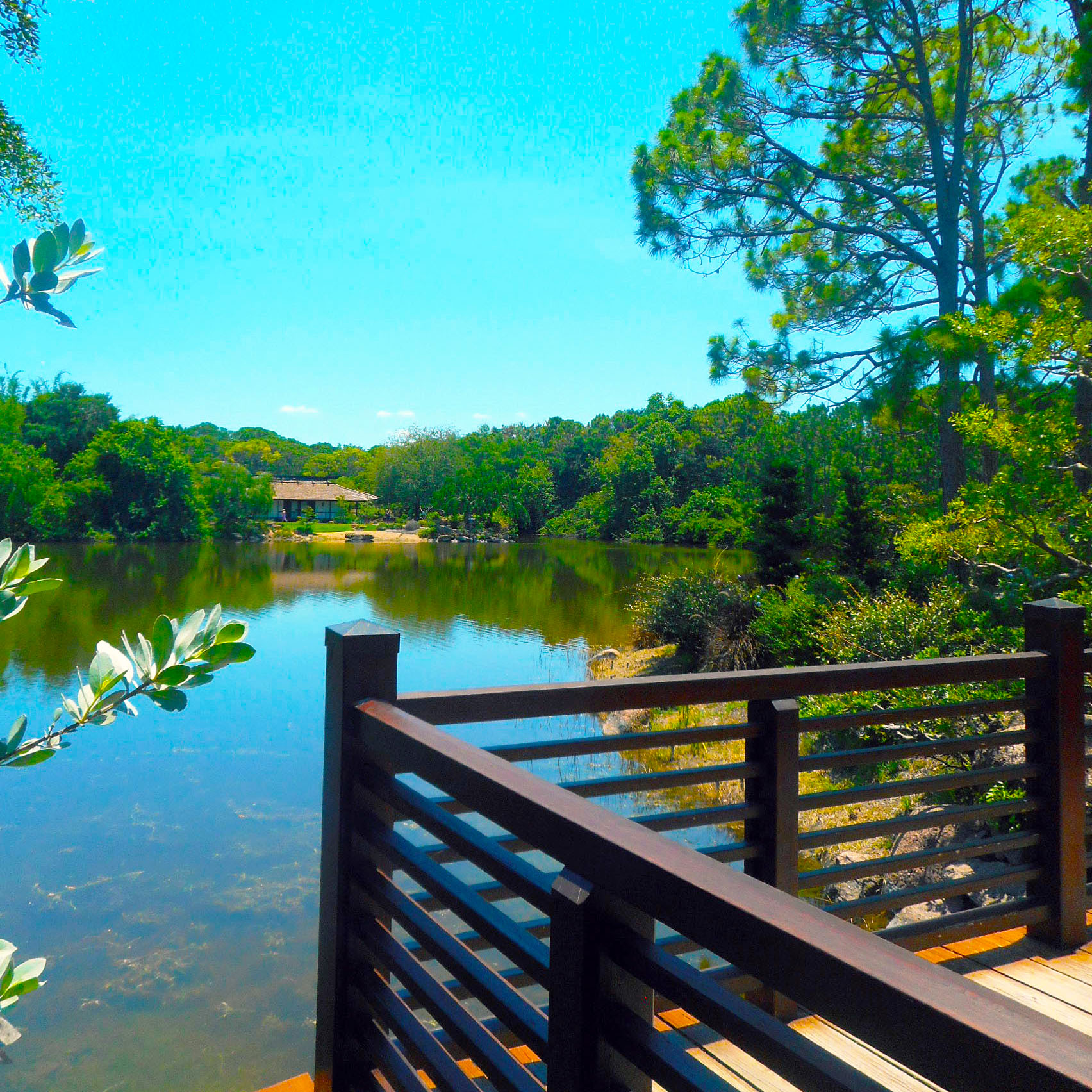
View Towards Tea House

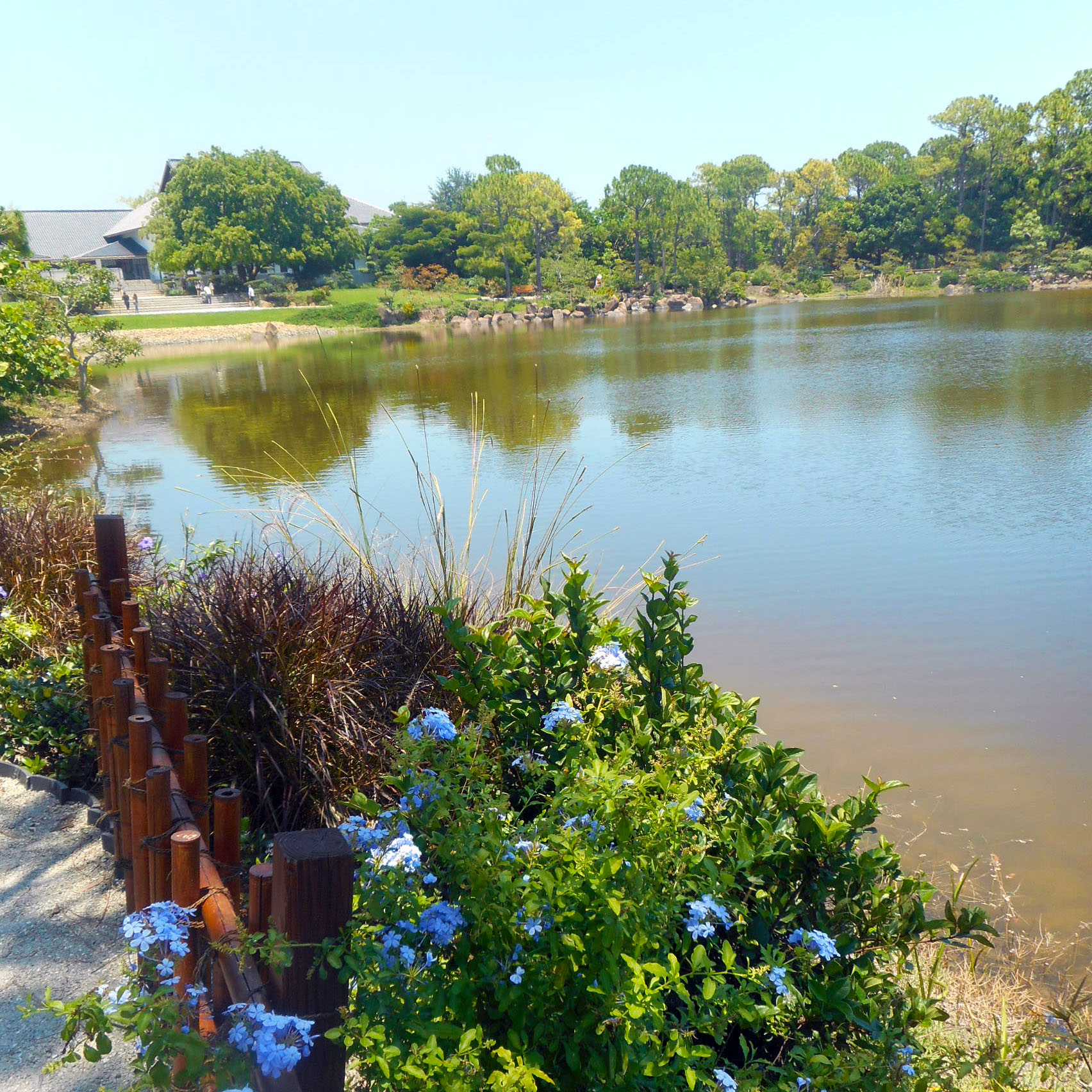
View of Museum Center from Island

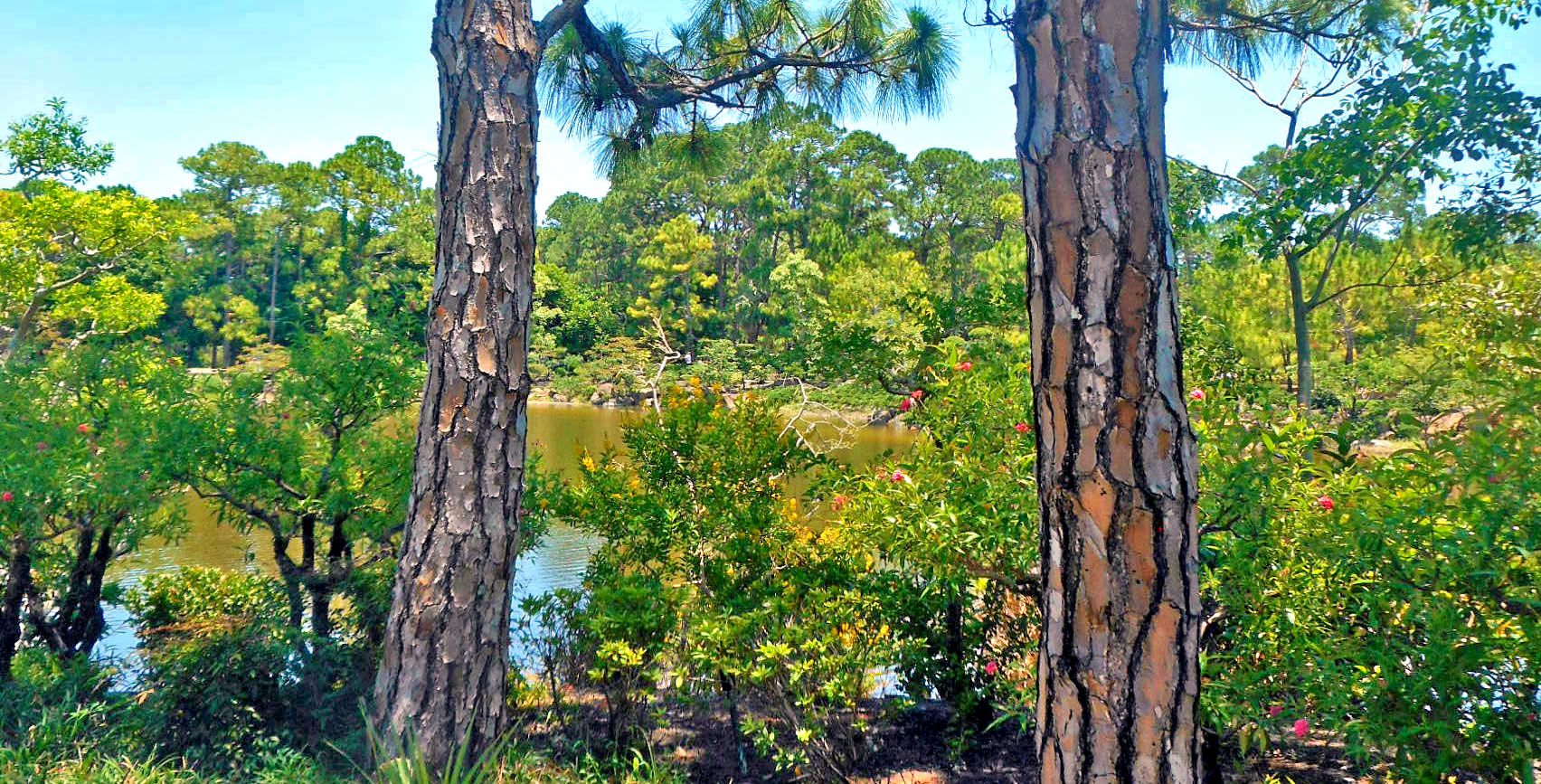
Detail of Garden Trees and Shrubbery

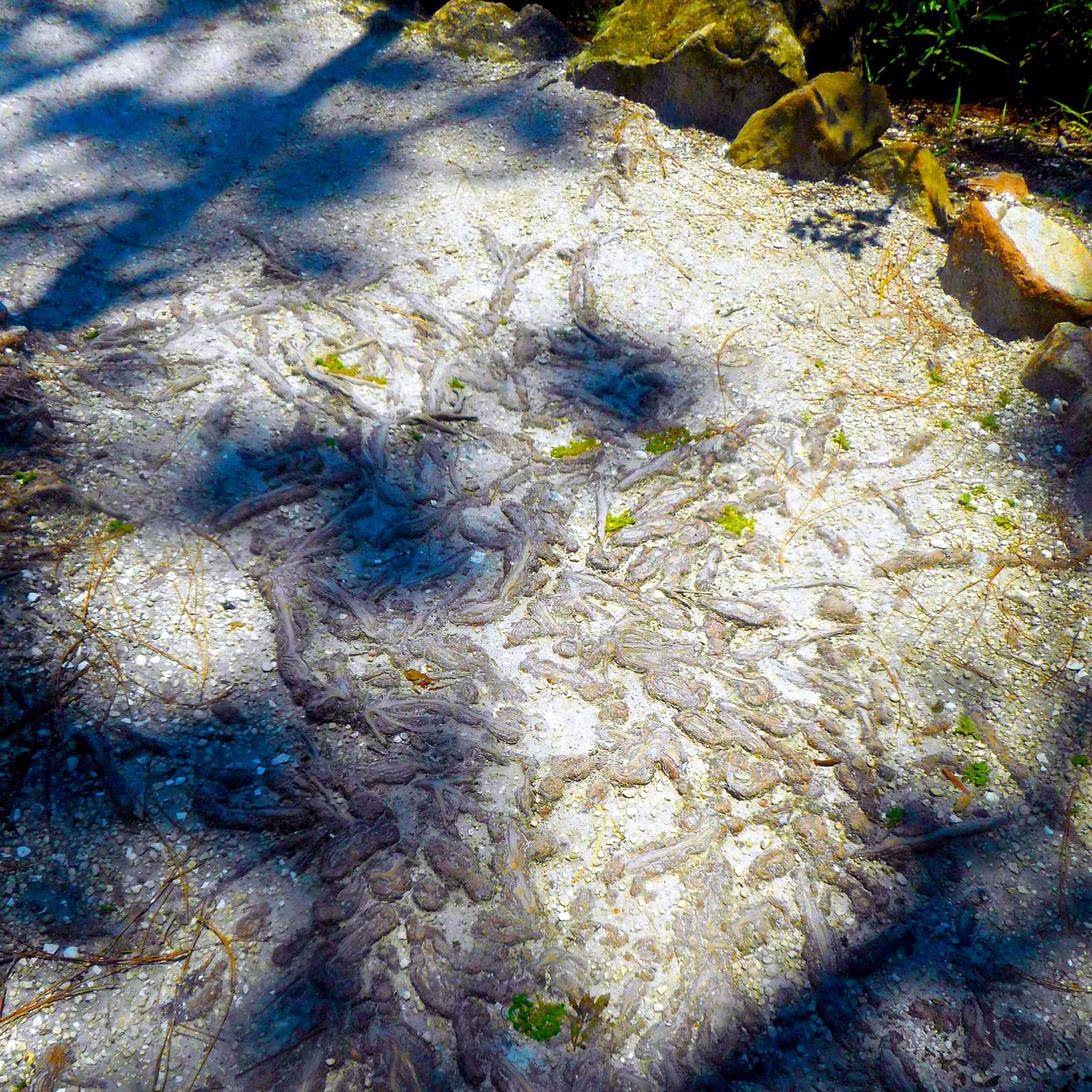
Pattern of Tree Roots Flattened By Continued Human Stepping

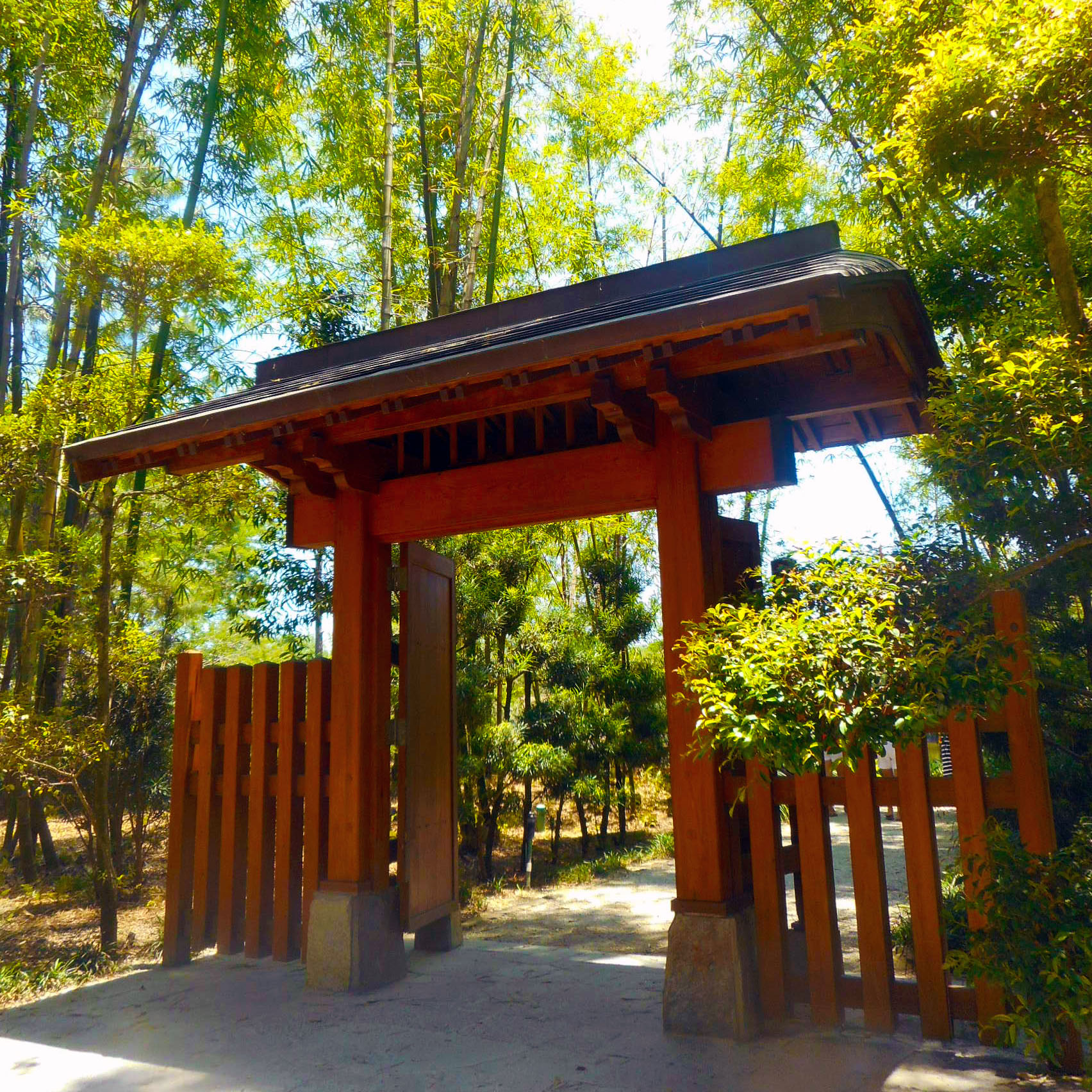
Kodai-mon or "Ancient Gate" at entrance to Bamboo Grove

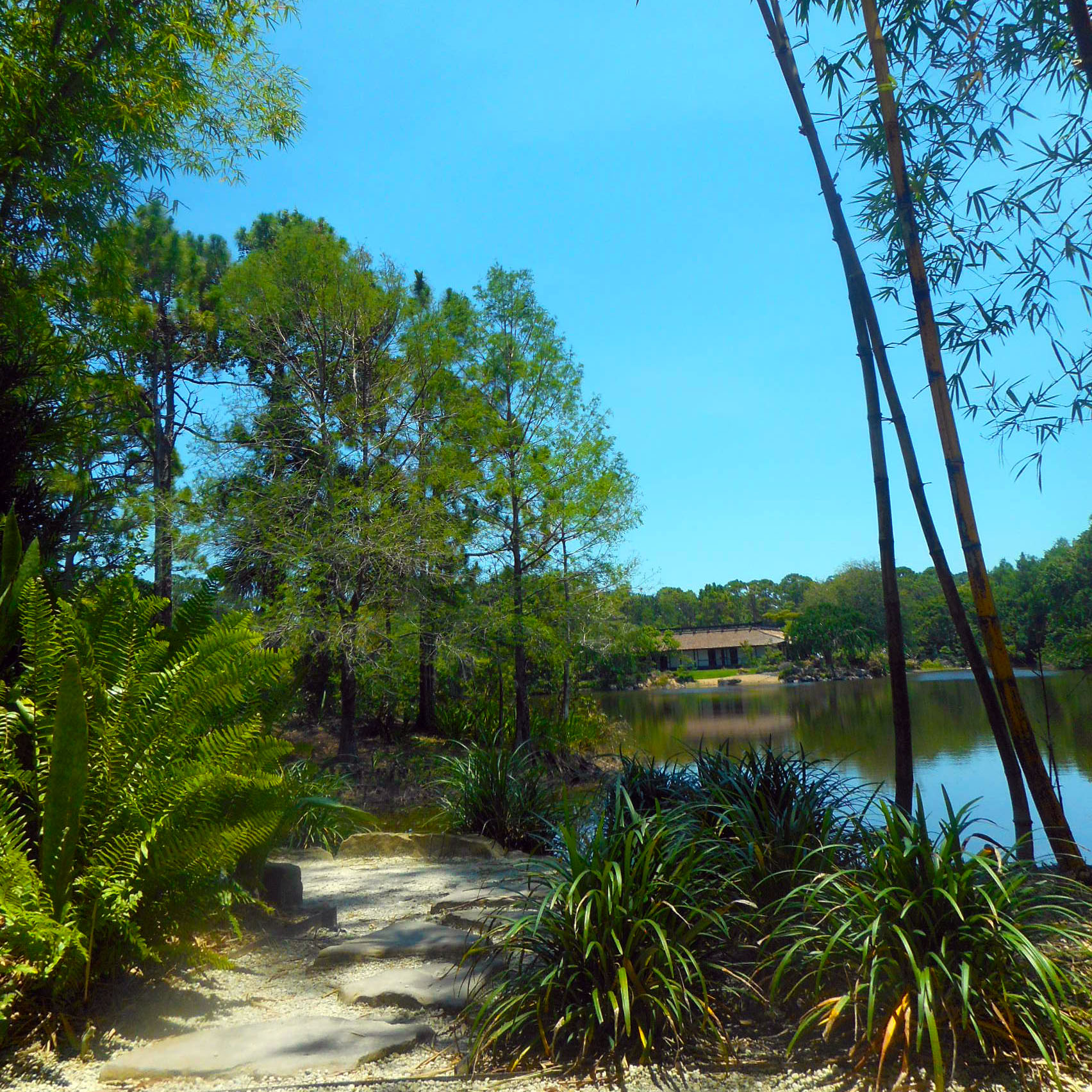
View of Tea House from Bamboo Grove

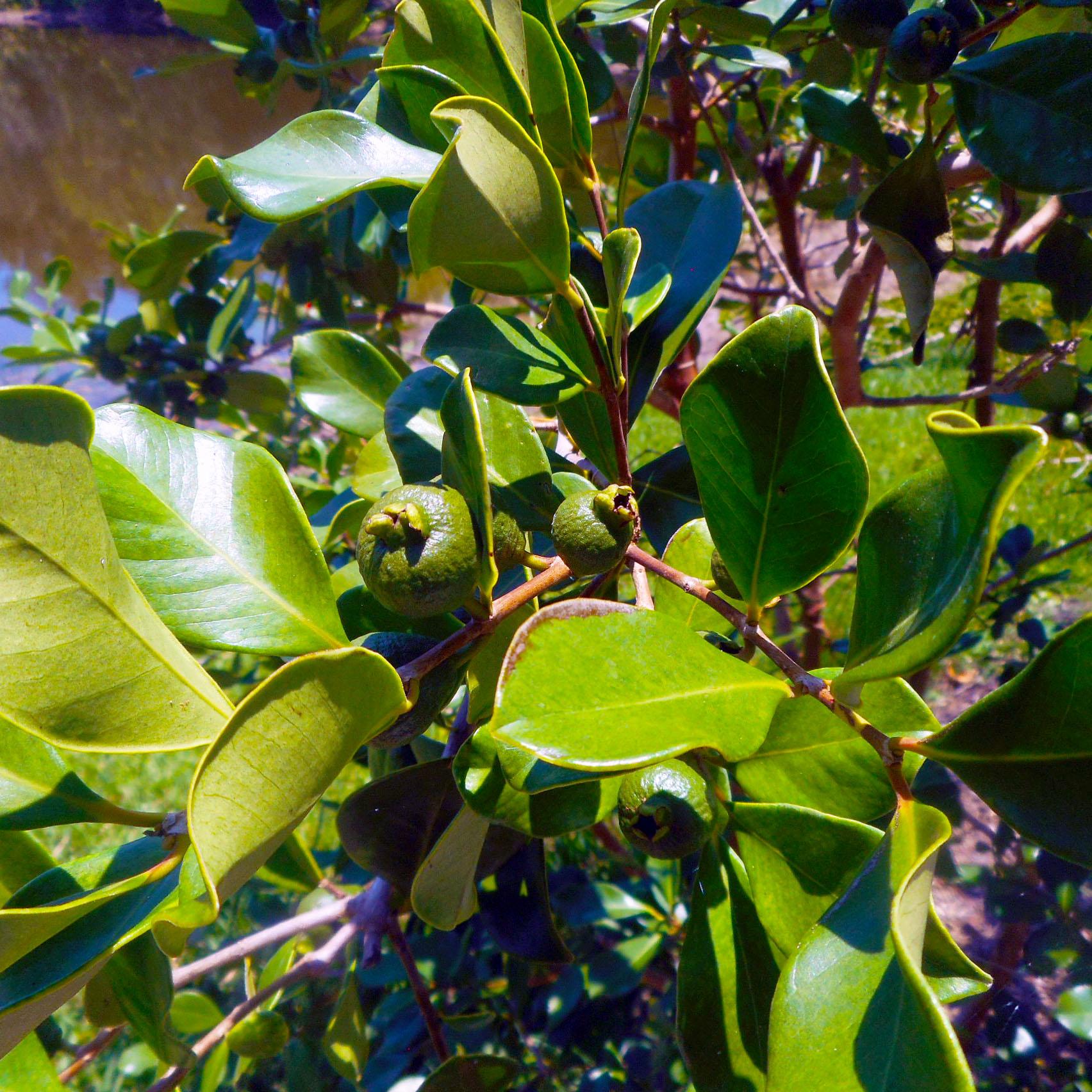
Guava Tree and Green Fruits

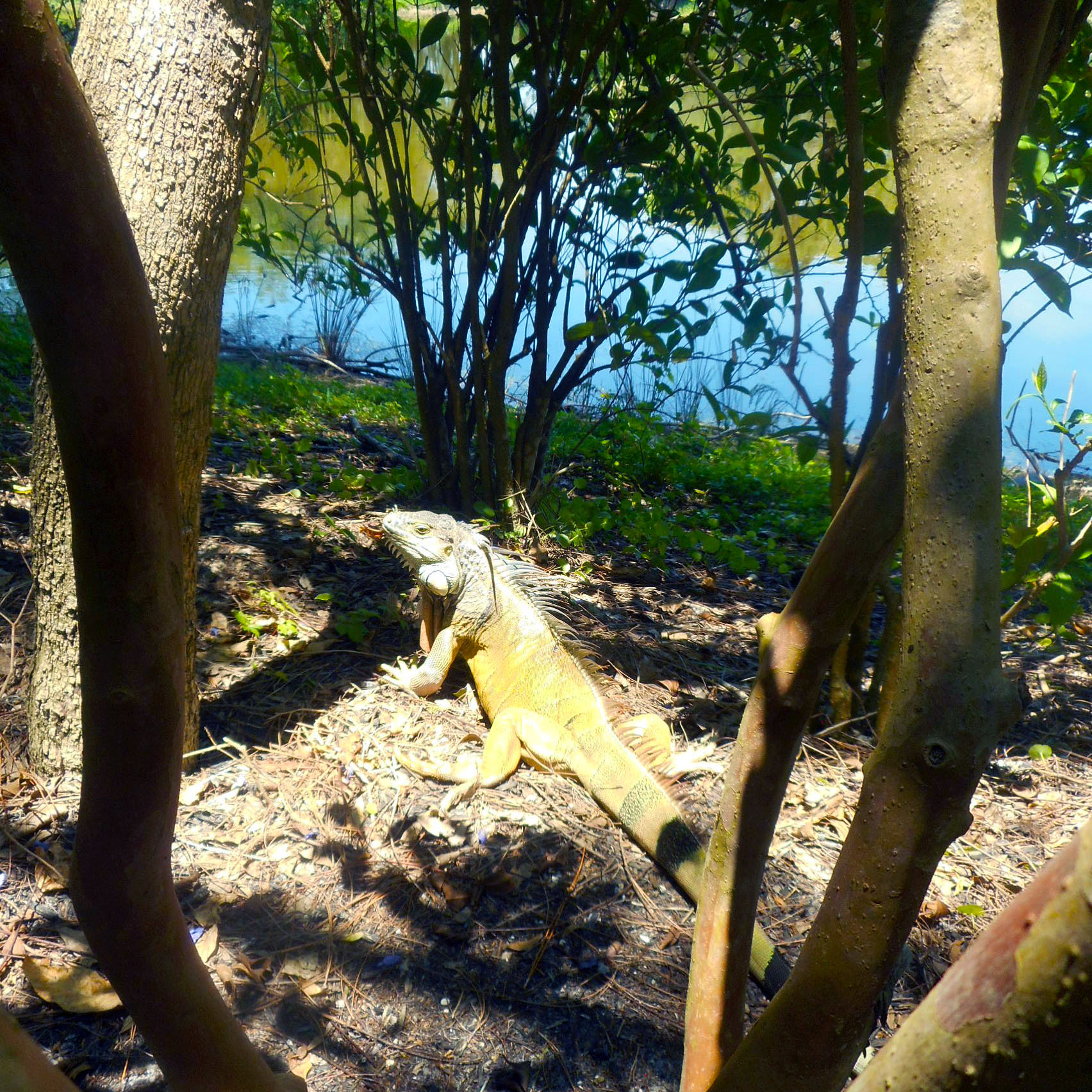
Green Iguana

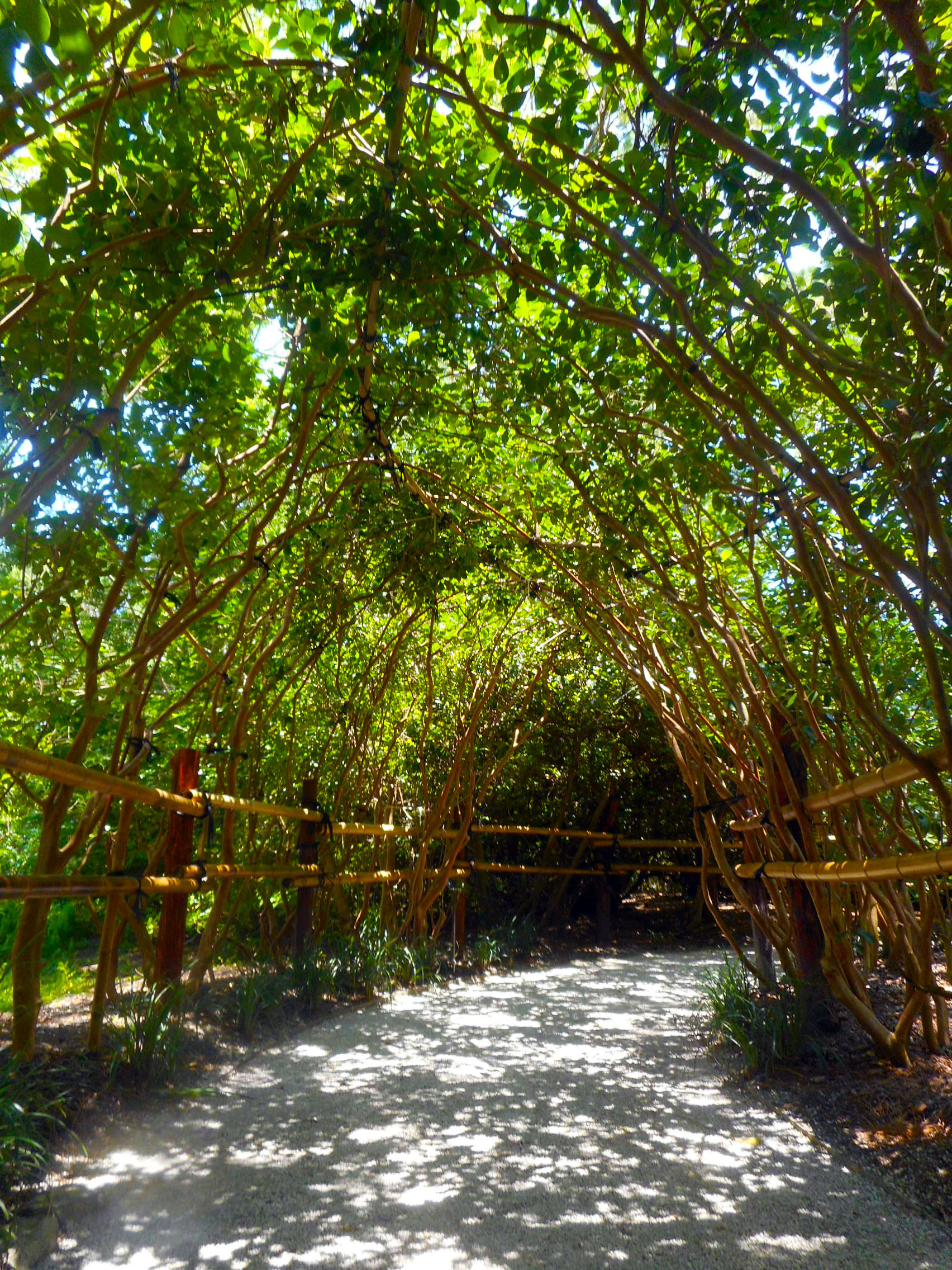
Tree-Covered Gravel Path

== Paradise Garden ==
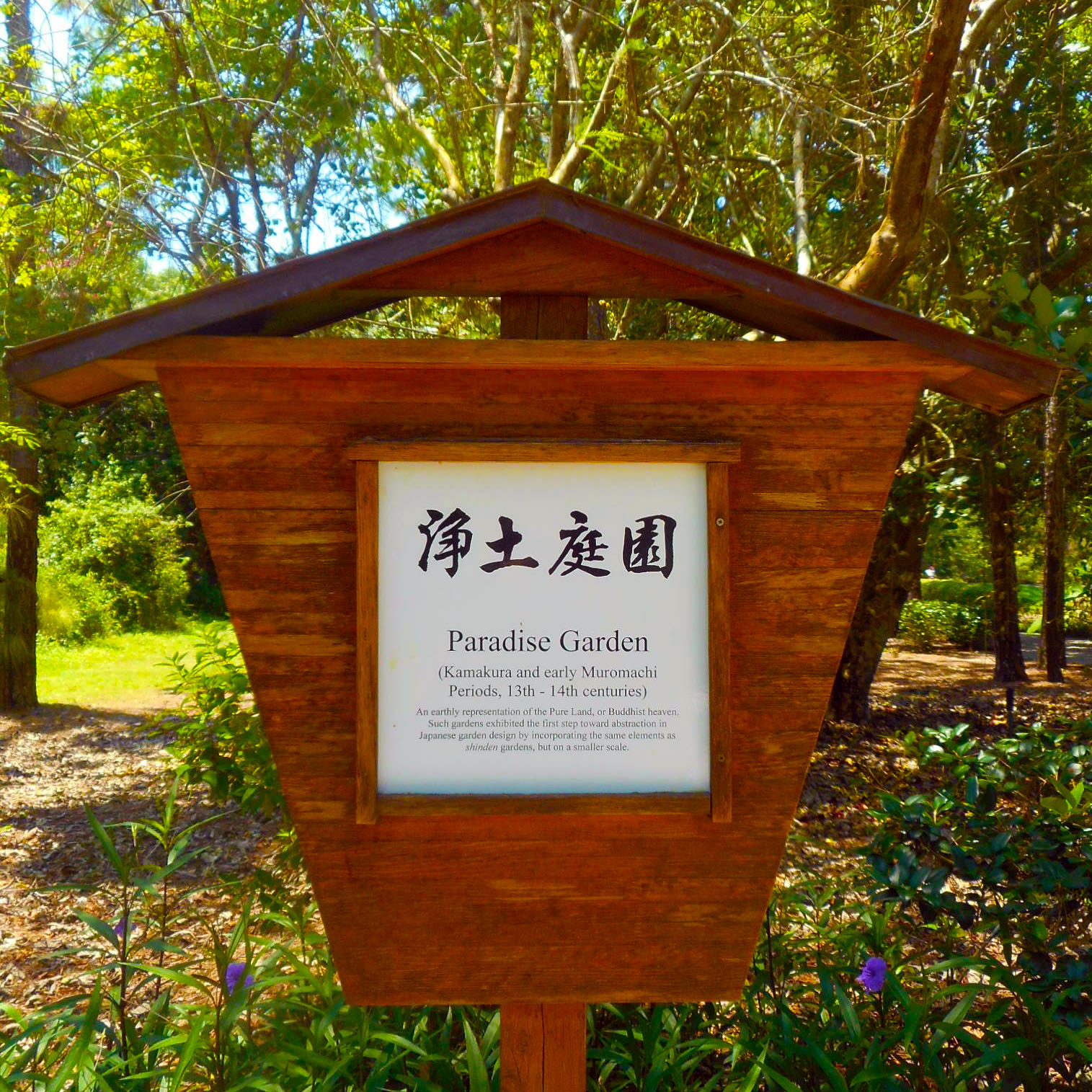
Paradise Garden Sign

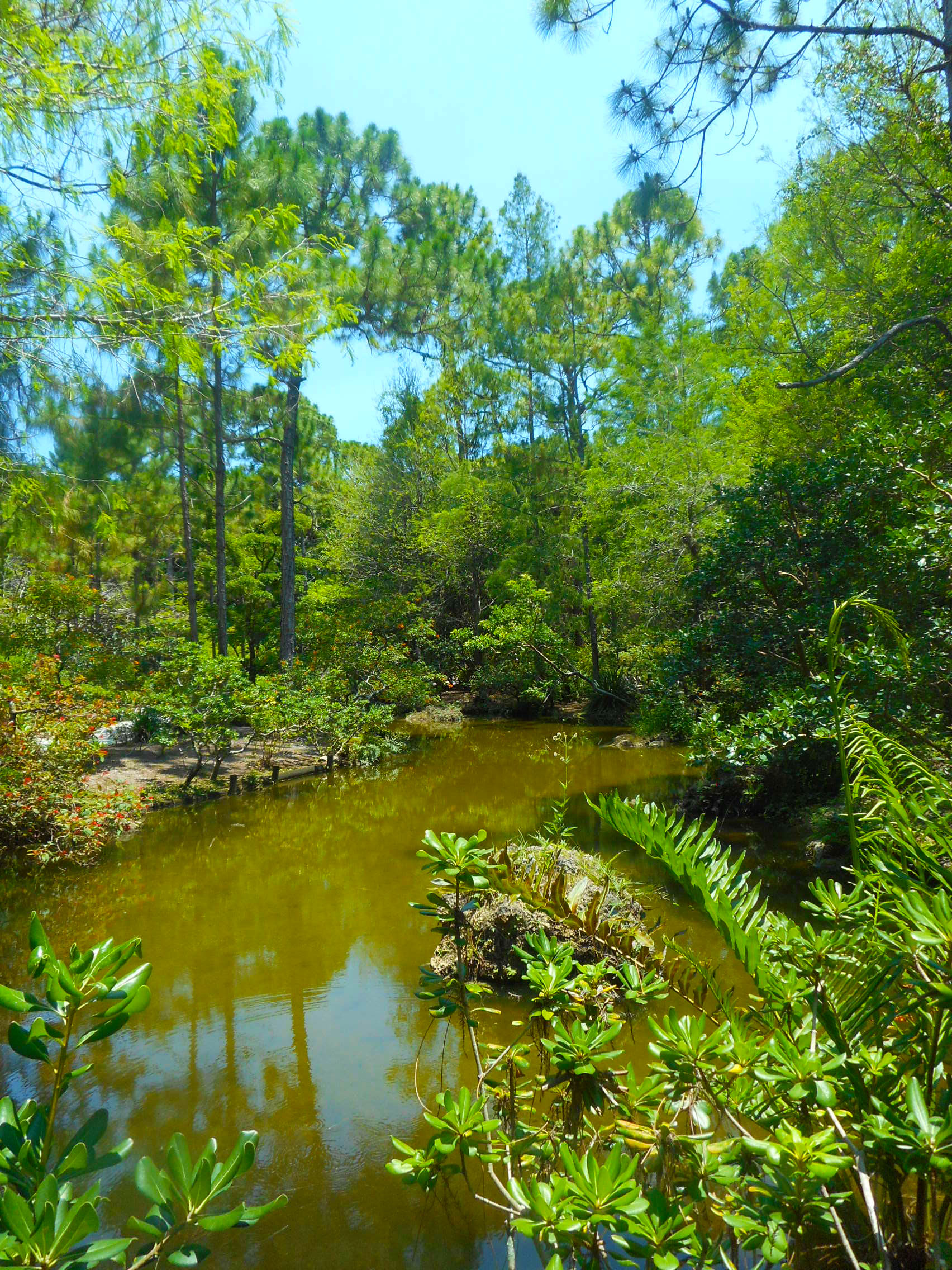
View of Pond and Trees

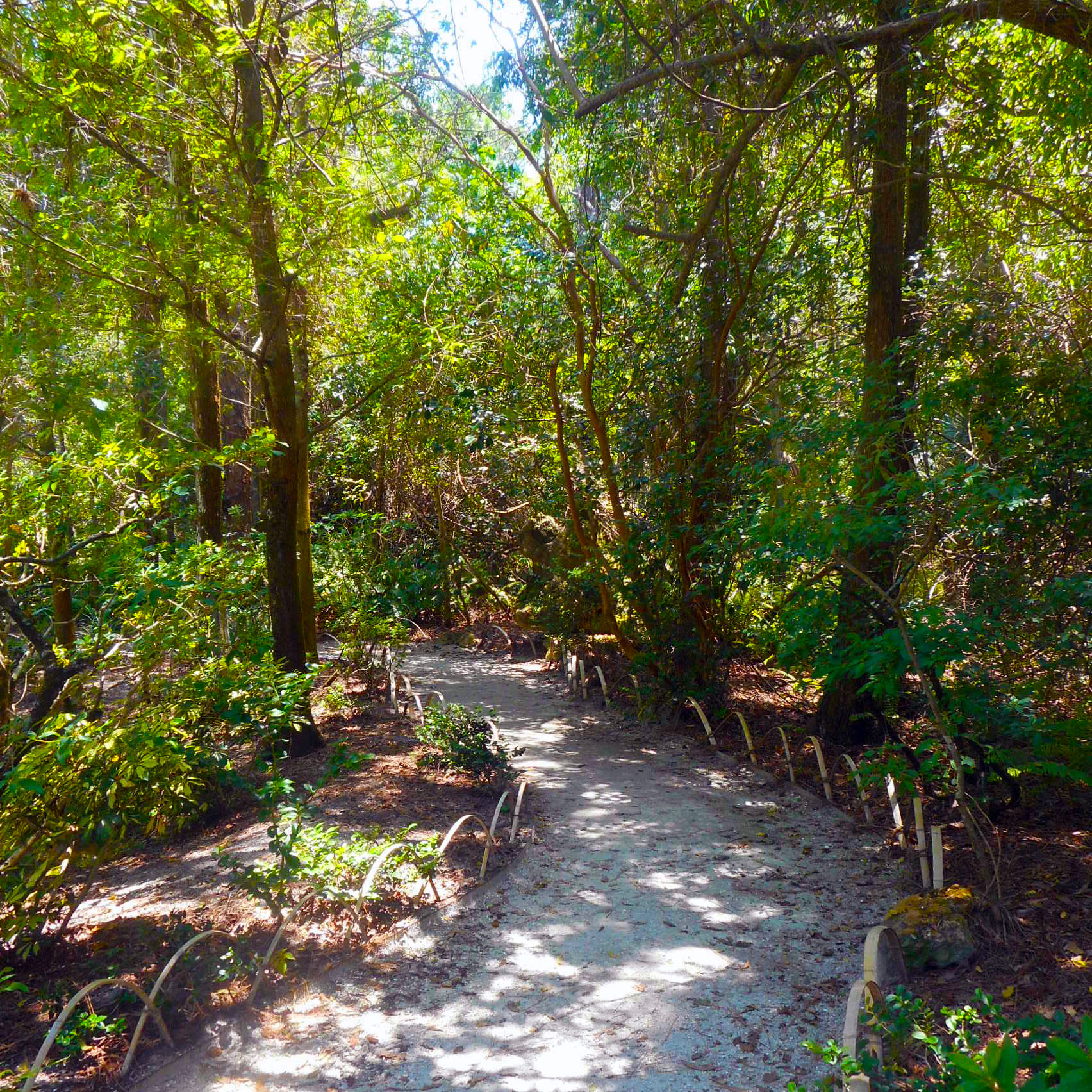
Garden Path

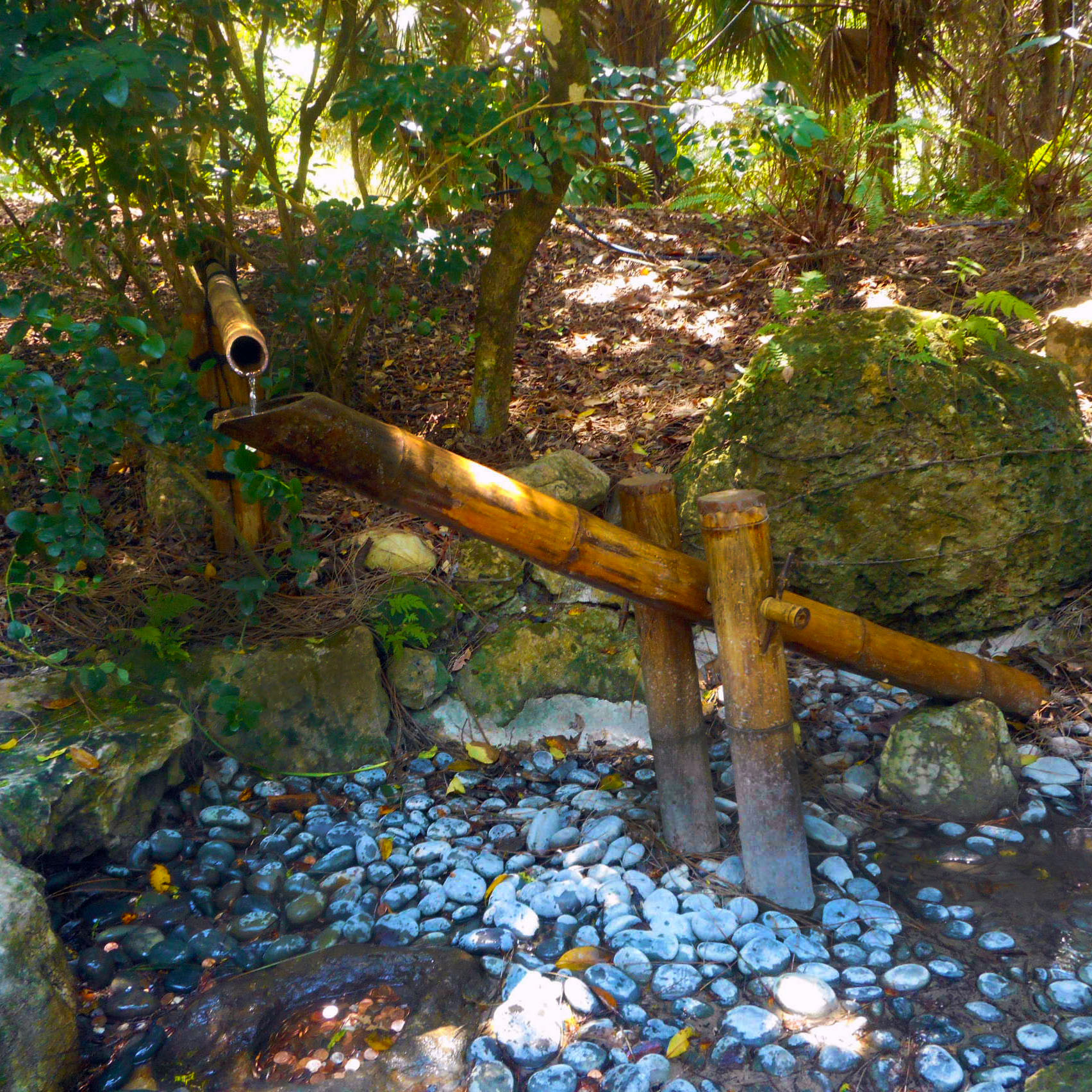
Shishi Odoshi or "Deer Chaser" Filling Up with Water

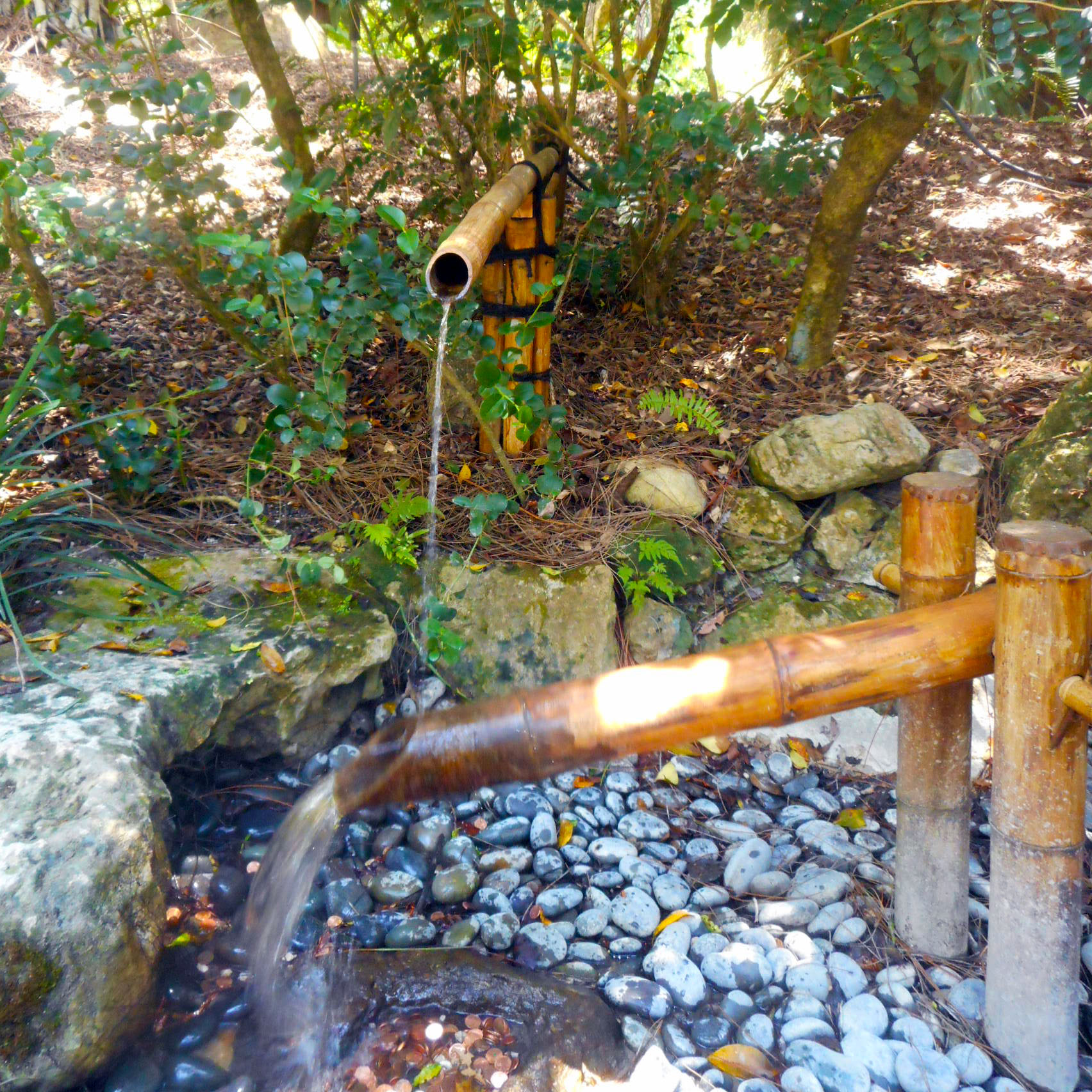
Shishi Odoshi Emptying

== Early Rock Garden ==
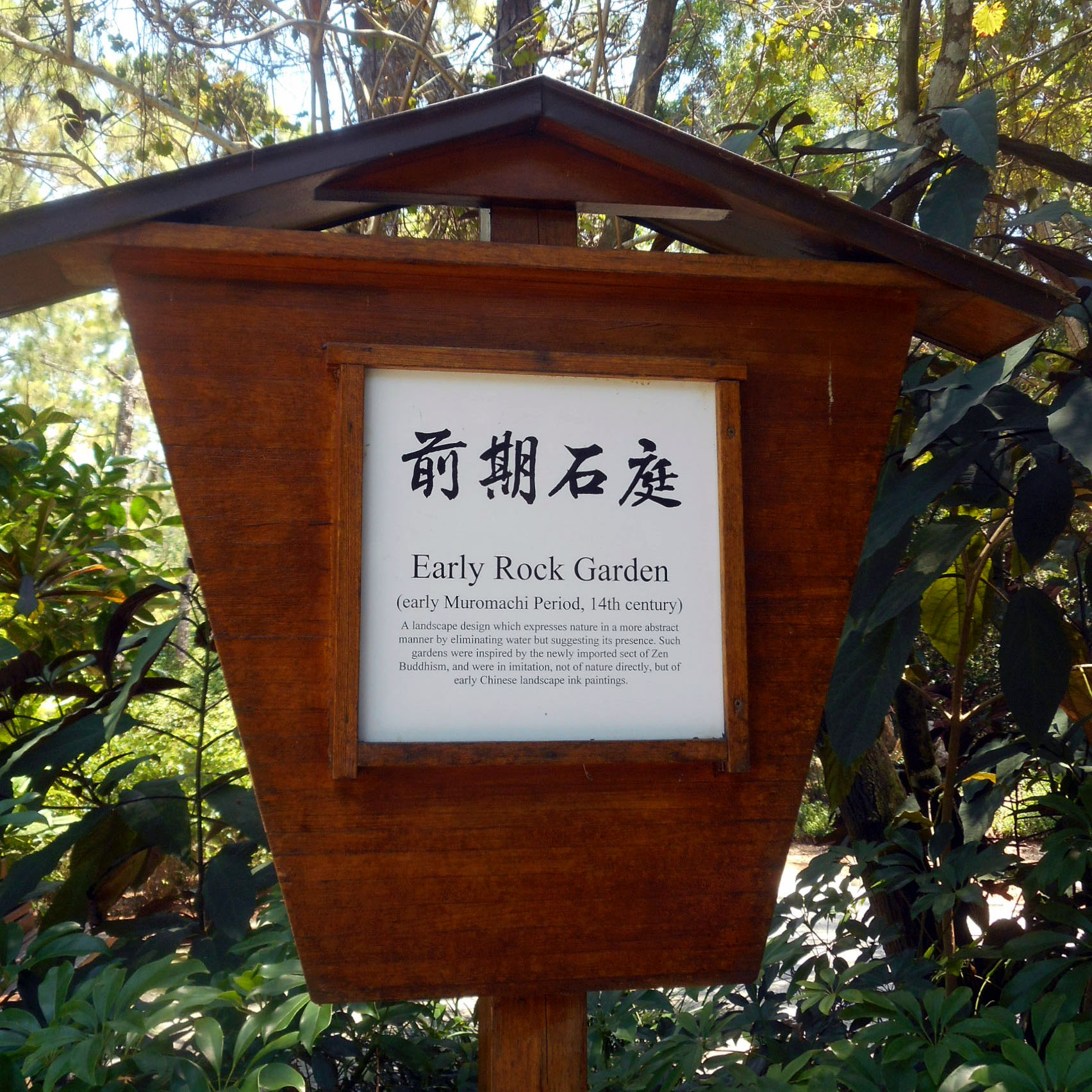
Early Rock Garden Sign

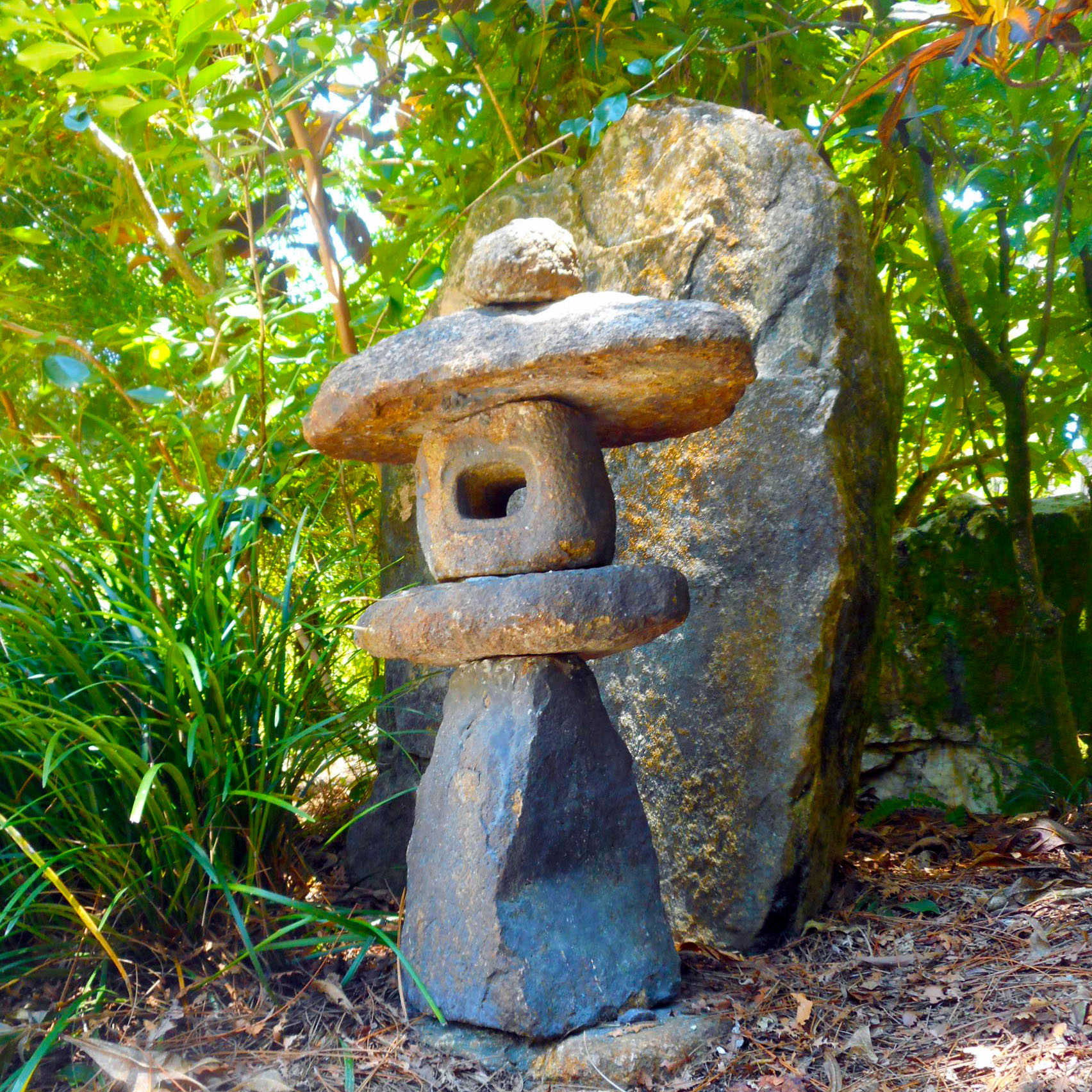
Stone Lantern

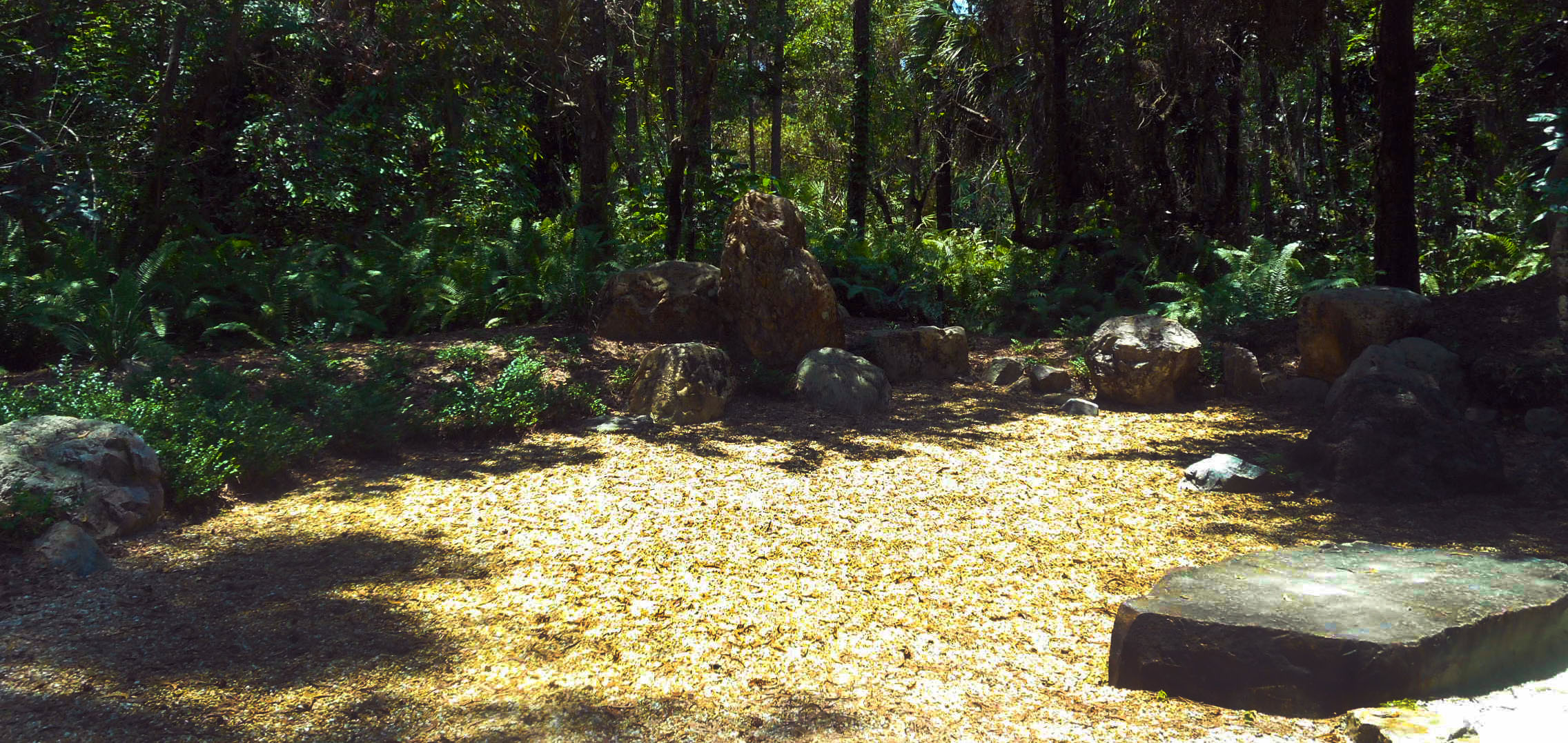
Early Rock Garden

== Karesansui Late Rock Garden ==
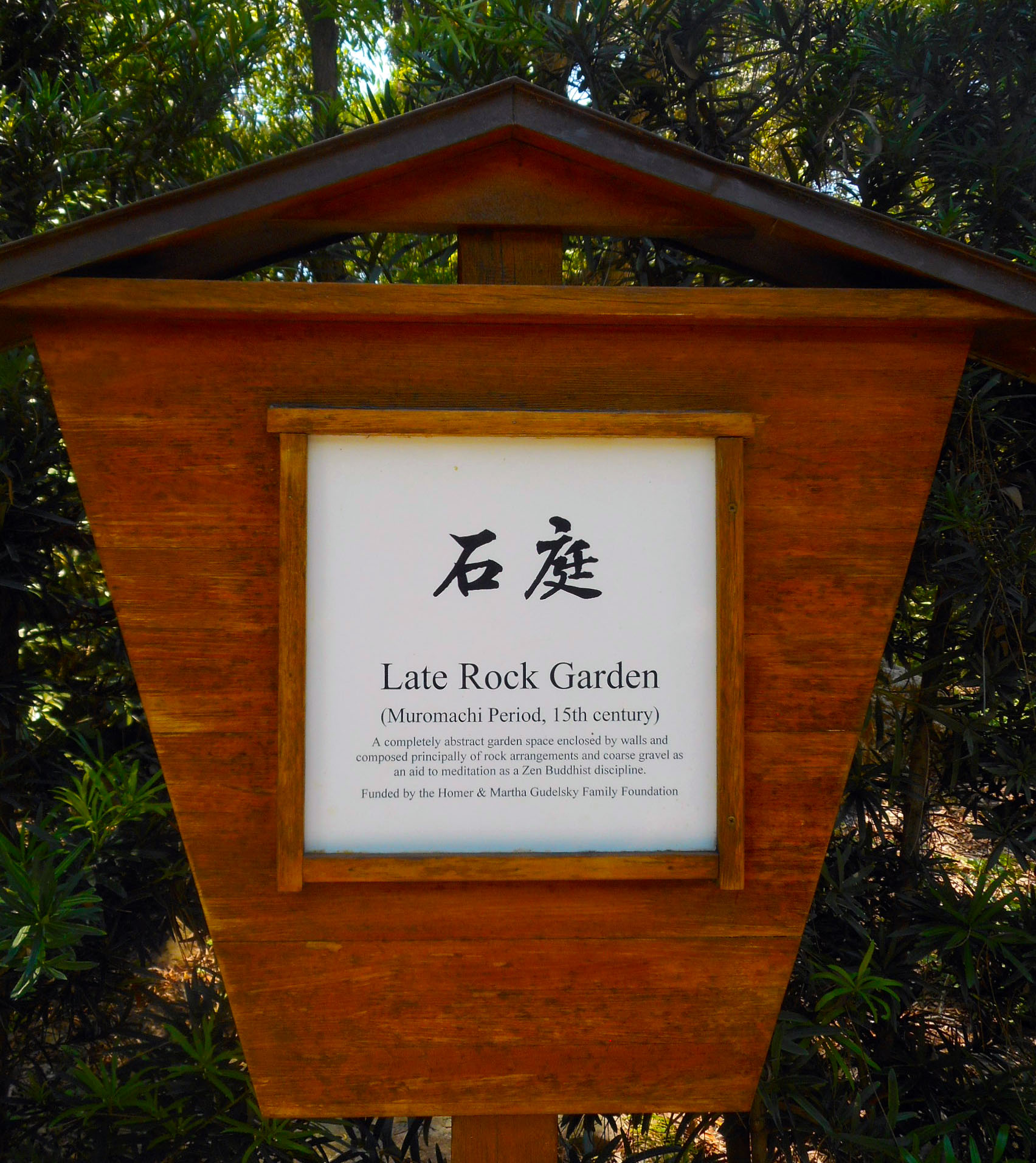
Late Rock Garden Sign

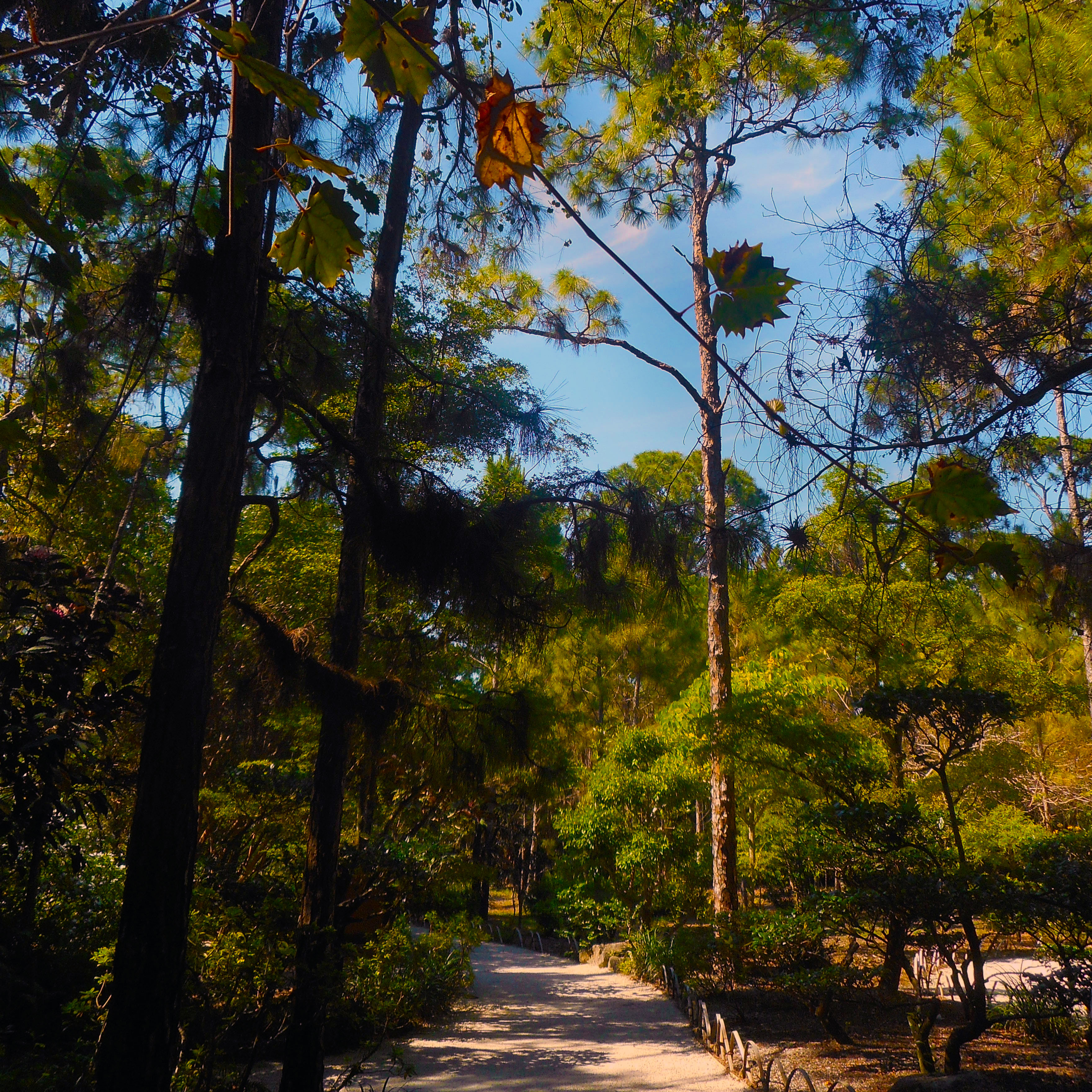
Path Leading from Garden

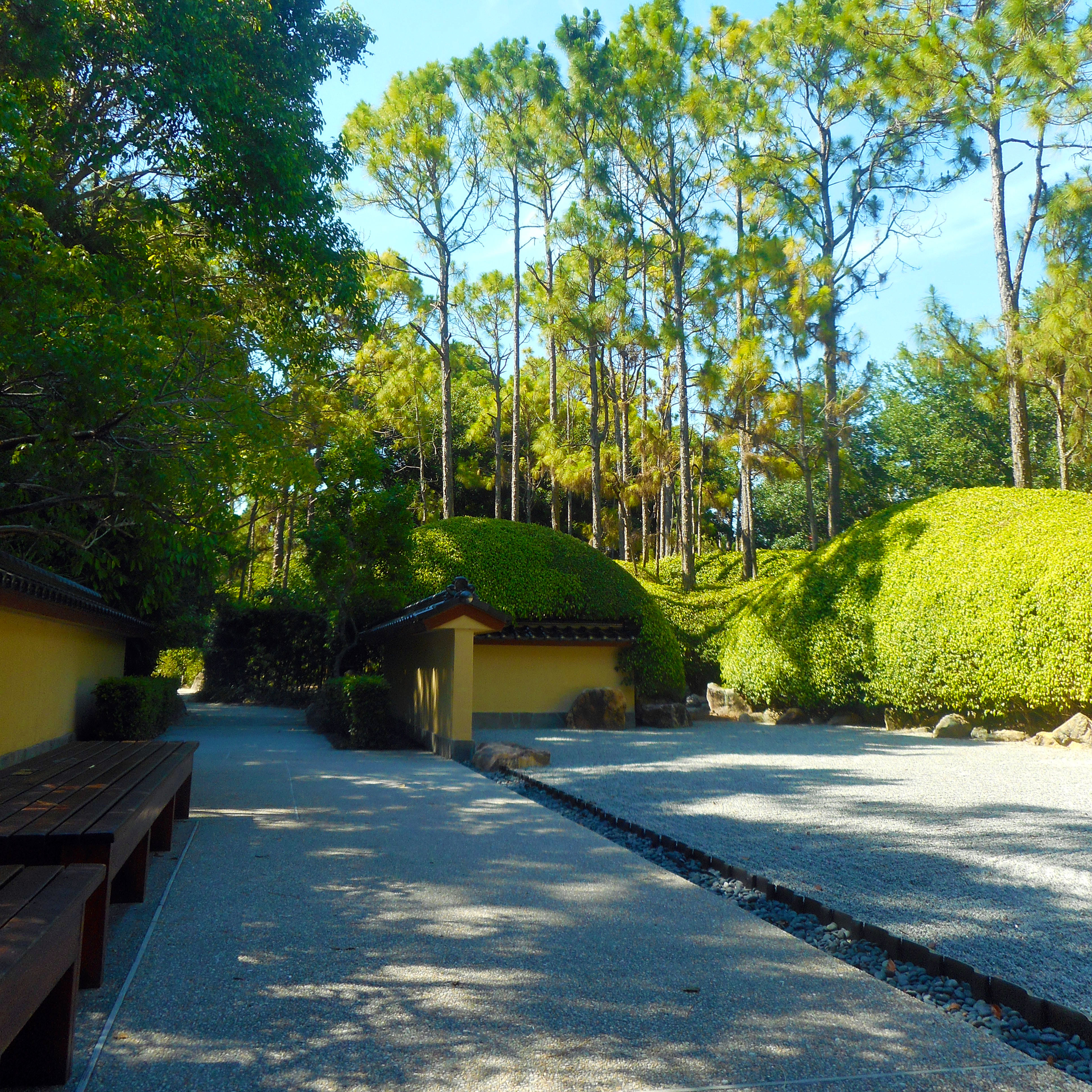
View Towards Entrance of Garden Enclosure

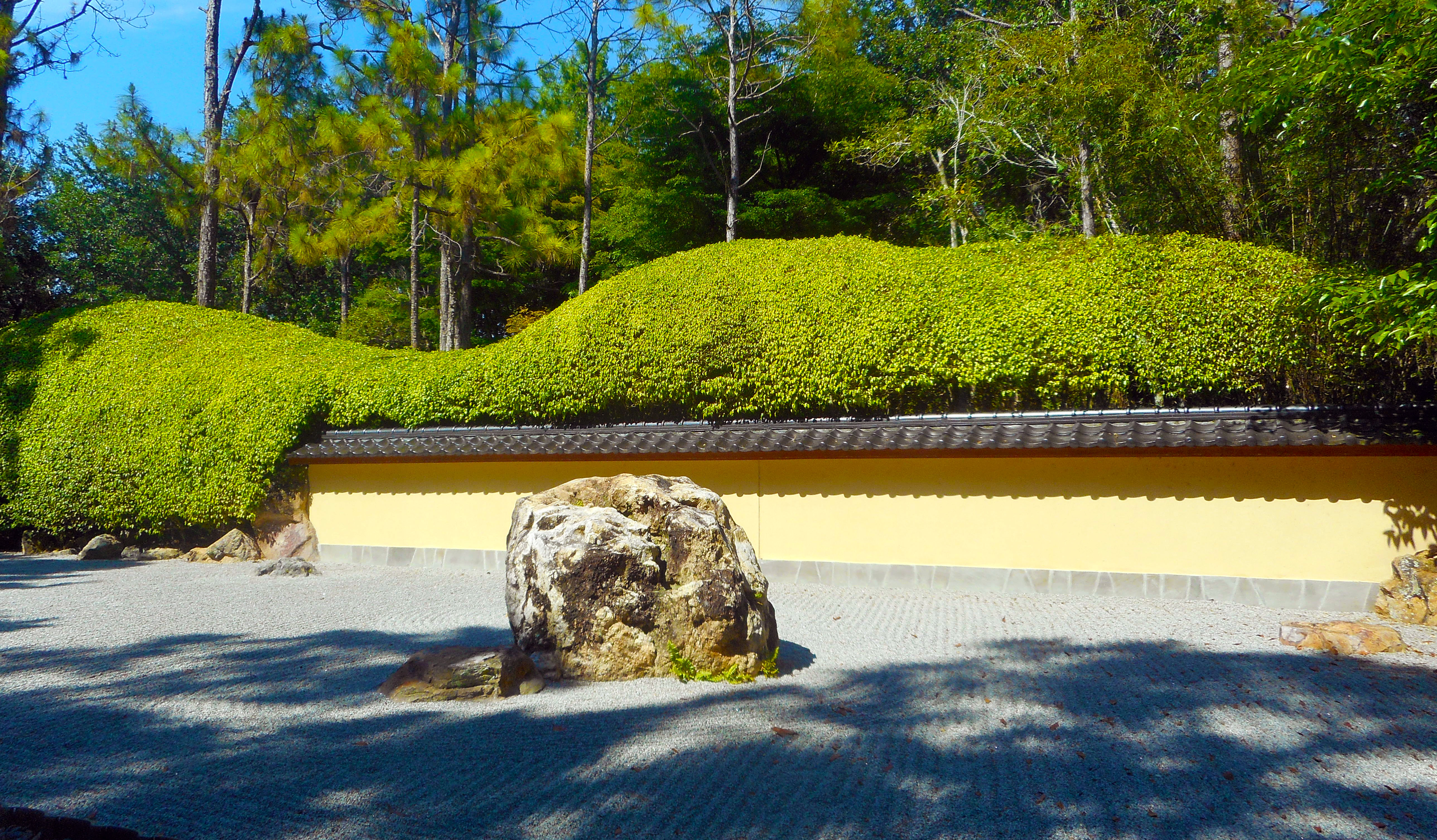
Gravel and Rocks Representing Islands and Ocean

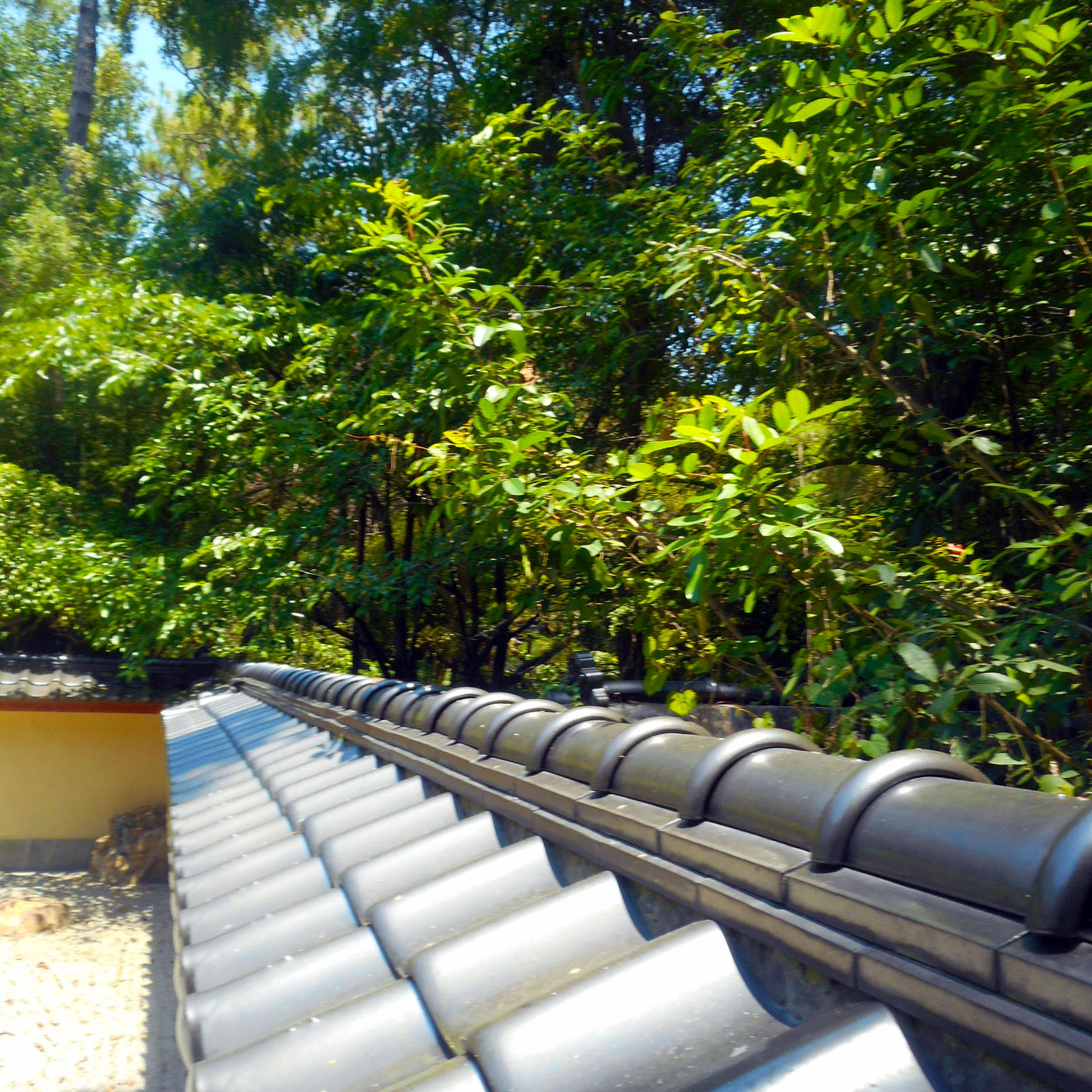
View of Tiles Protecting Walls of Enclosure

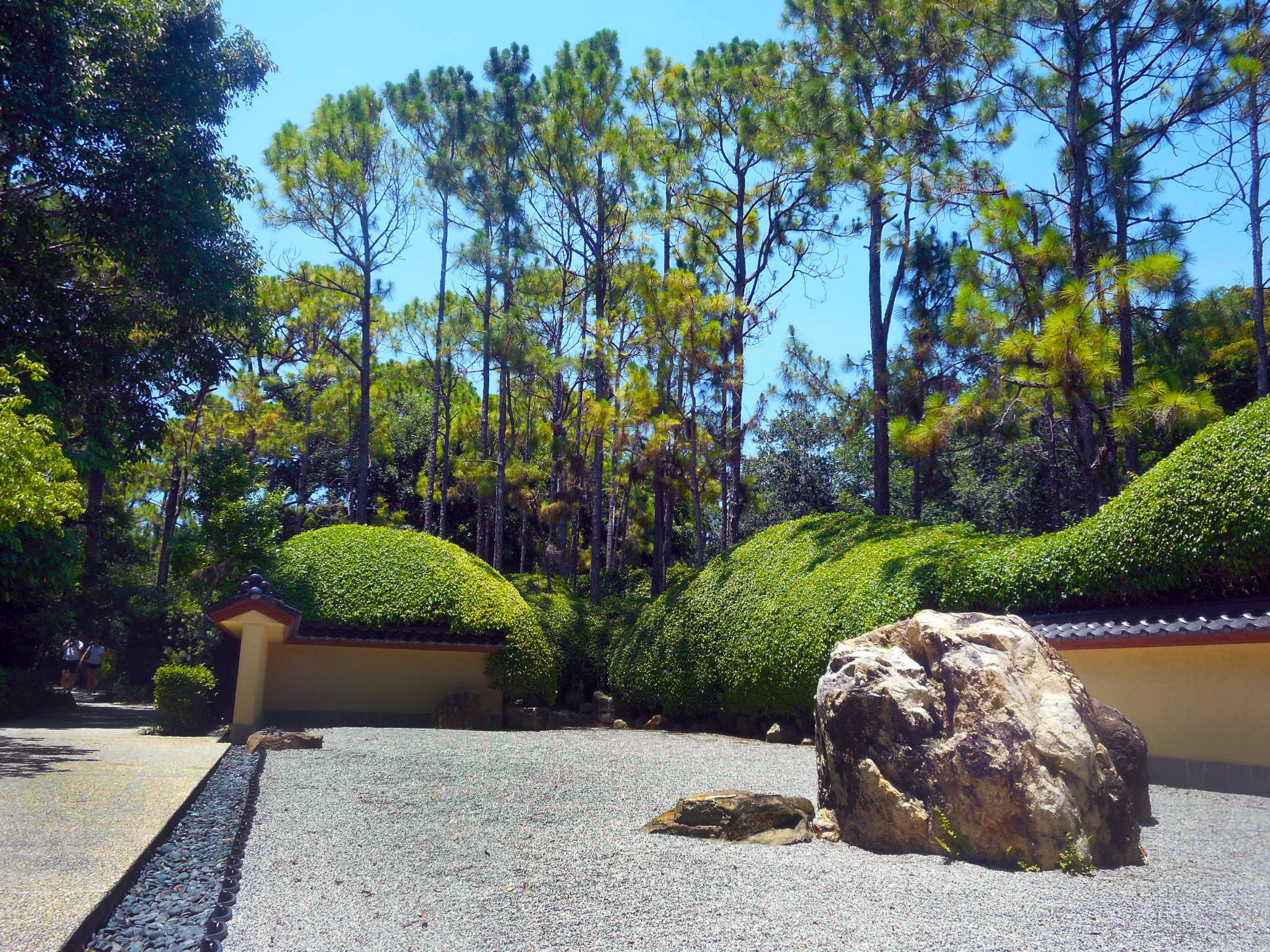
View from Ground Level Towards Enclosure Entrance

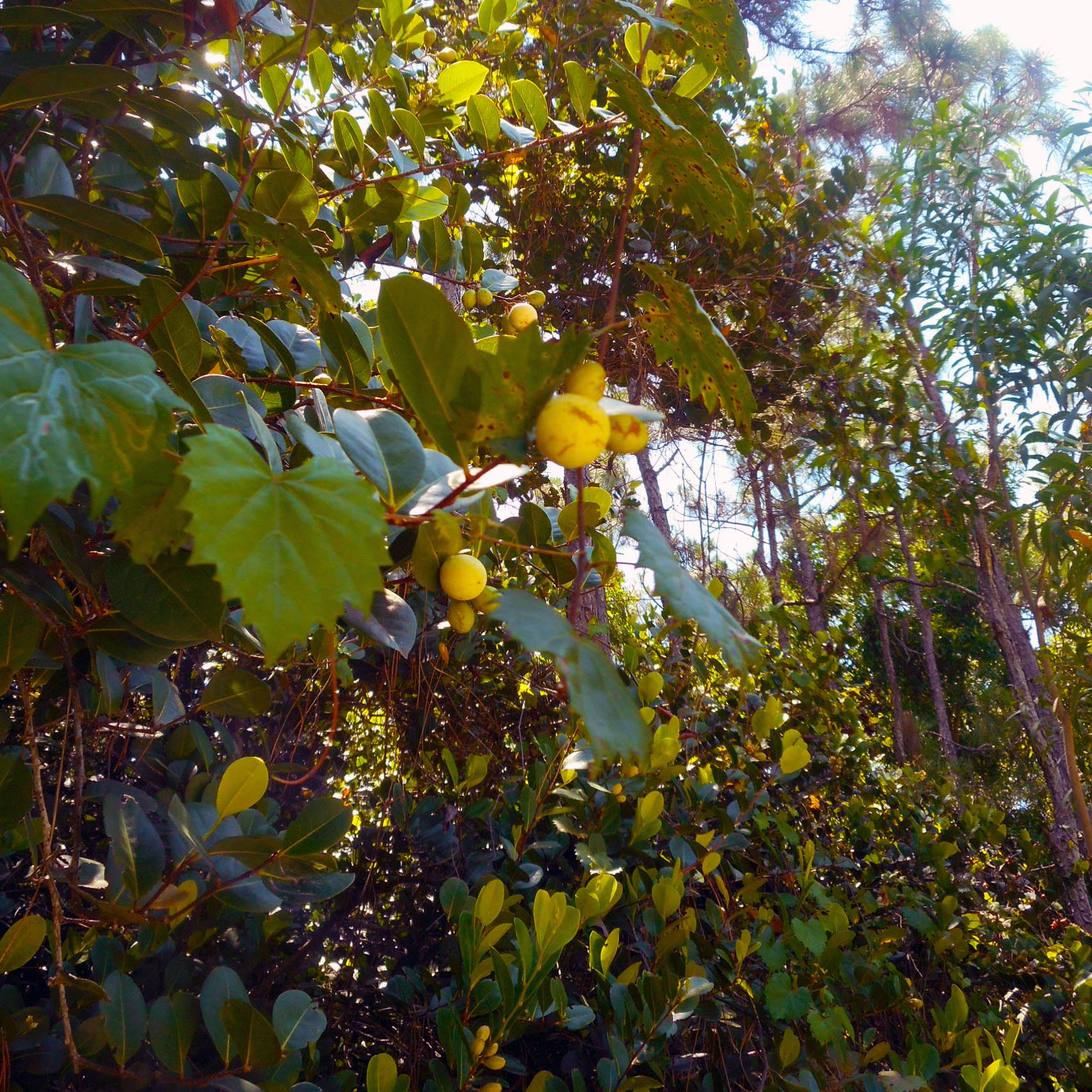
Icaco tree with white fruits growing next to Late Rock Garden

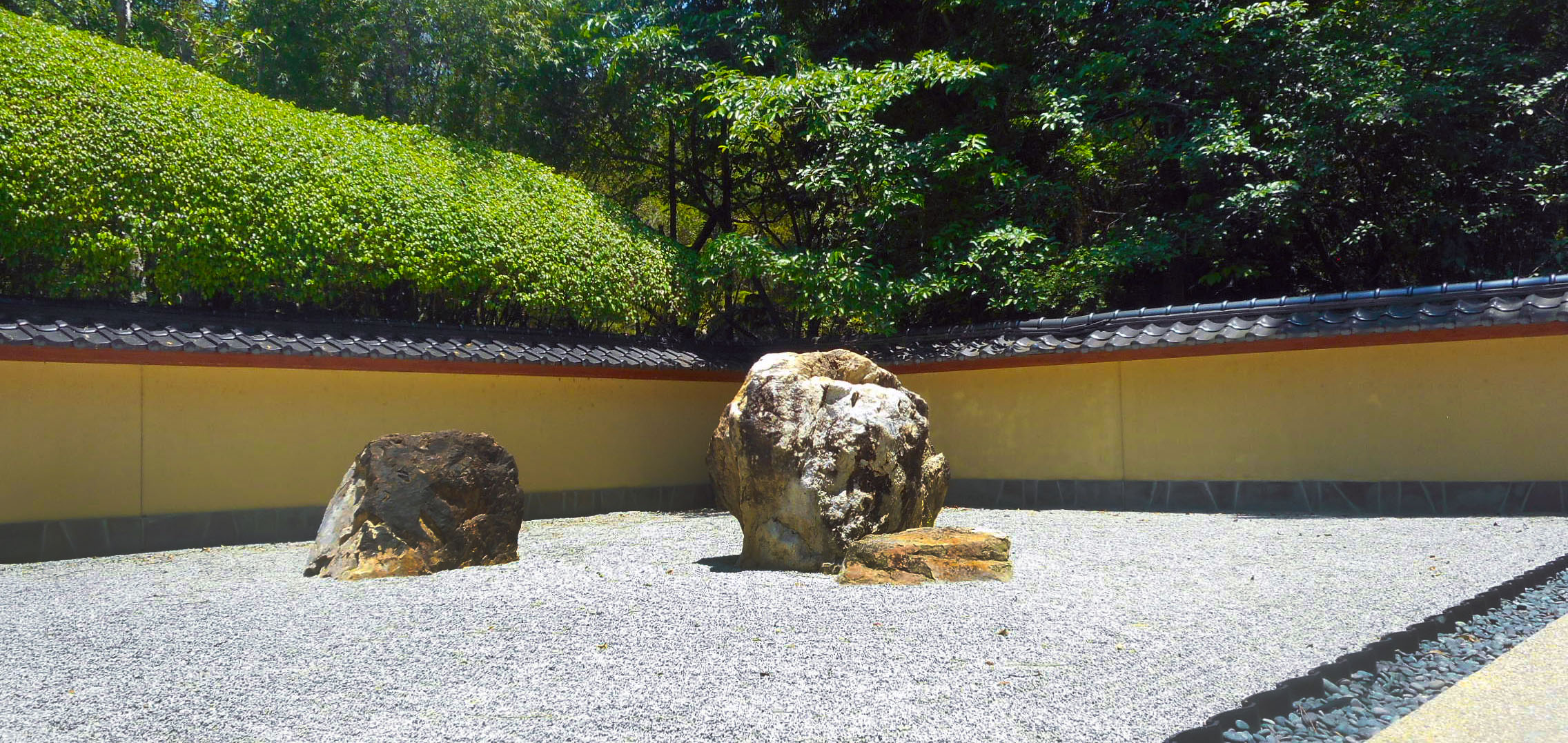
View from Entrance of Enclosure to Back Walls

== Hiraniwa Flat Rock Garden ==
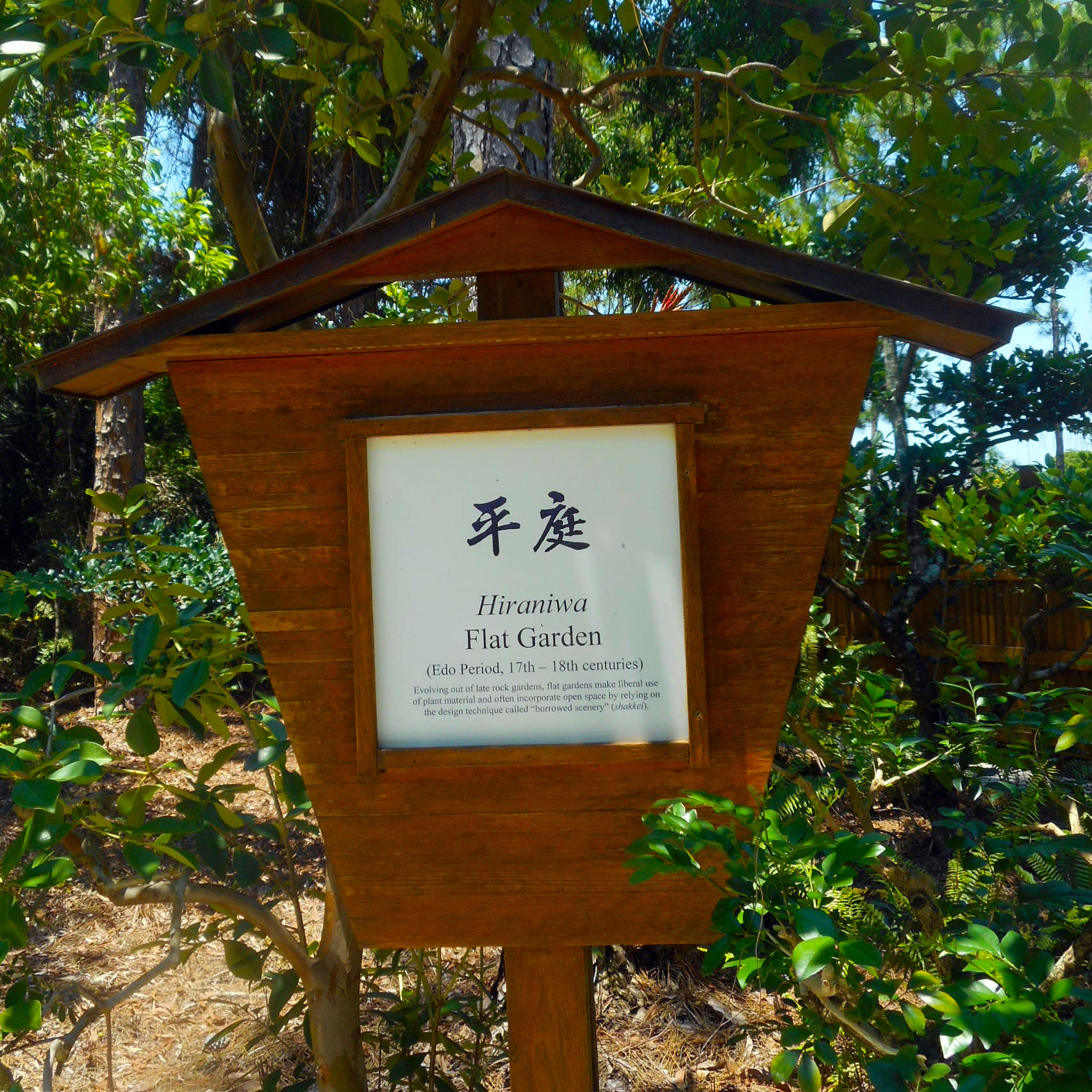
Hiraniwa Flat Garden Sign

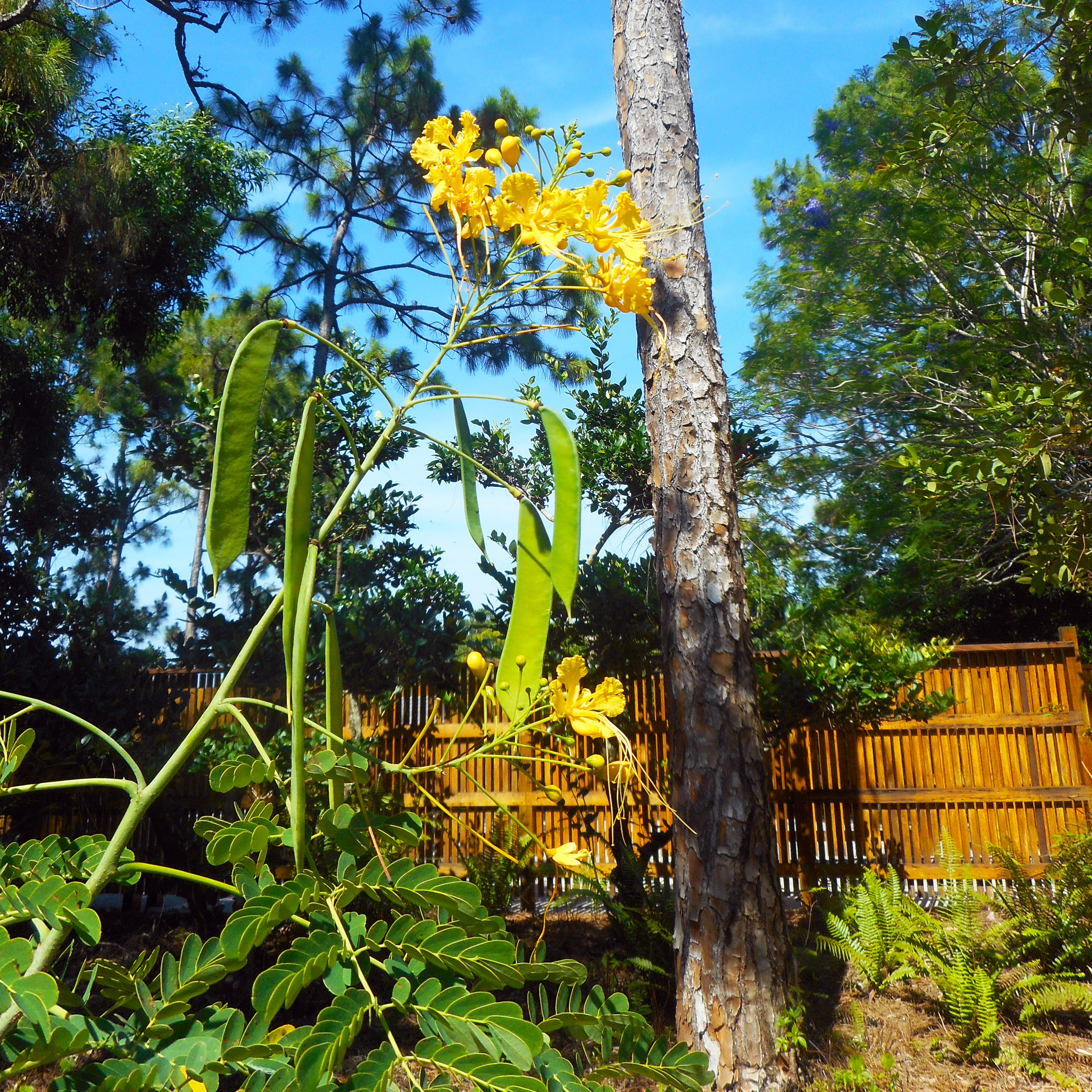
View of Back Wall

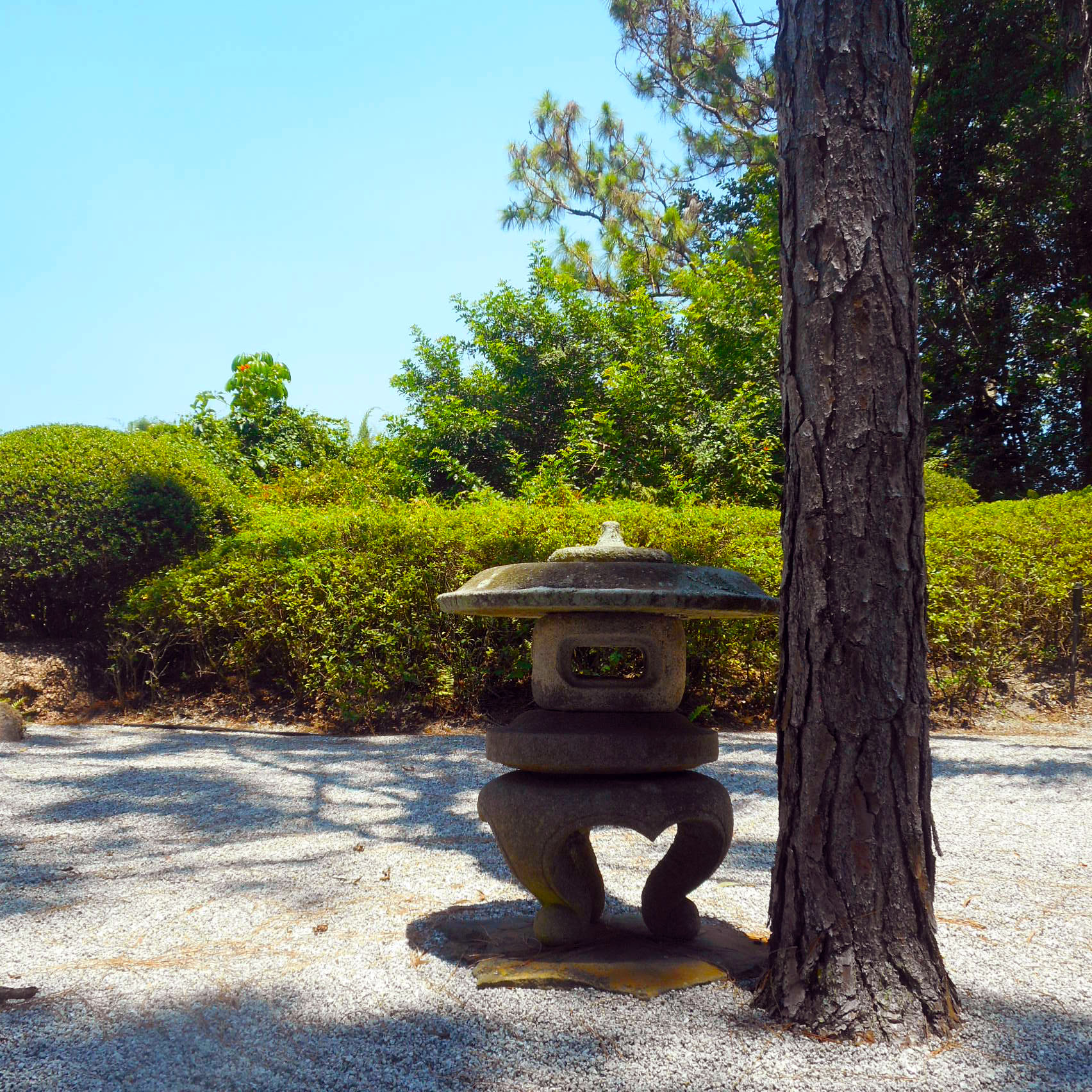
Stone Lantern and Pine Tree

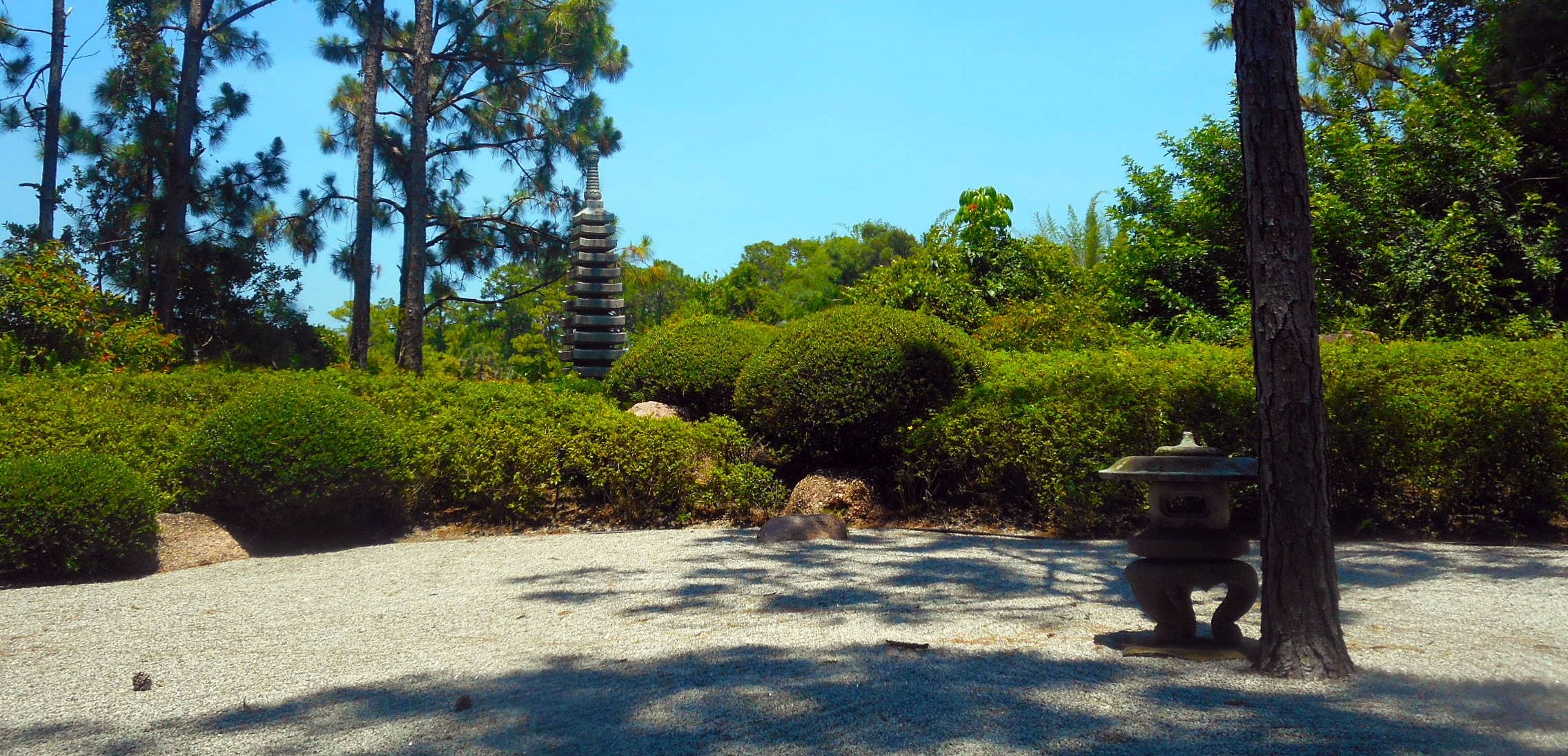
General View Sunny

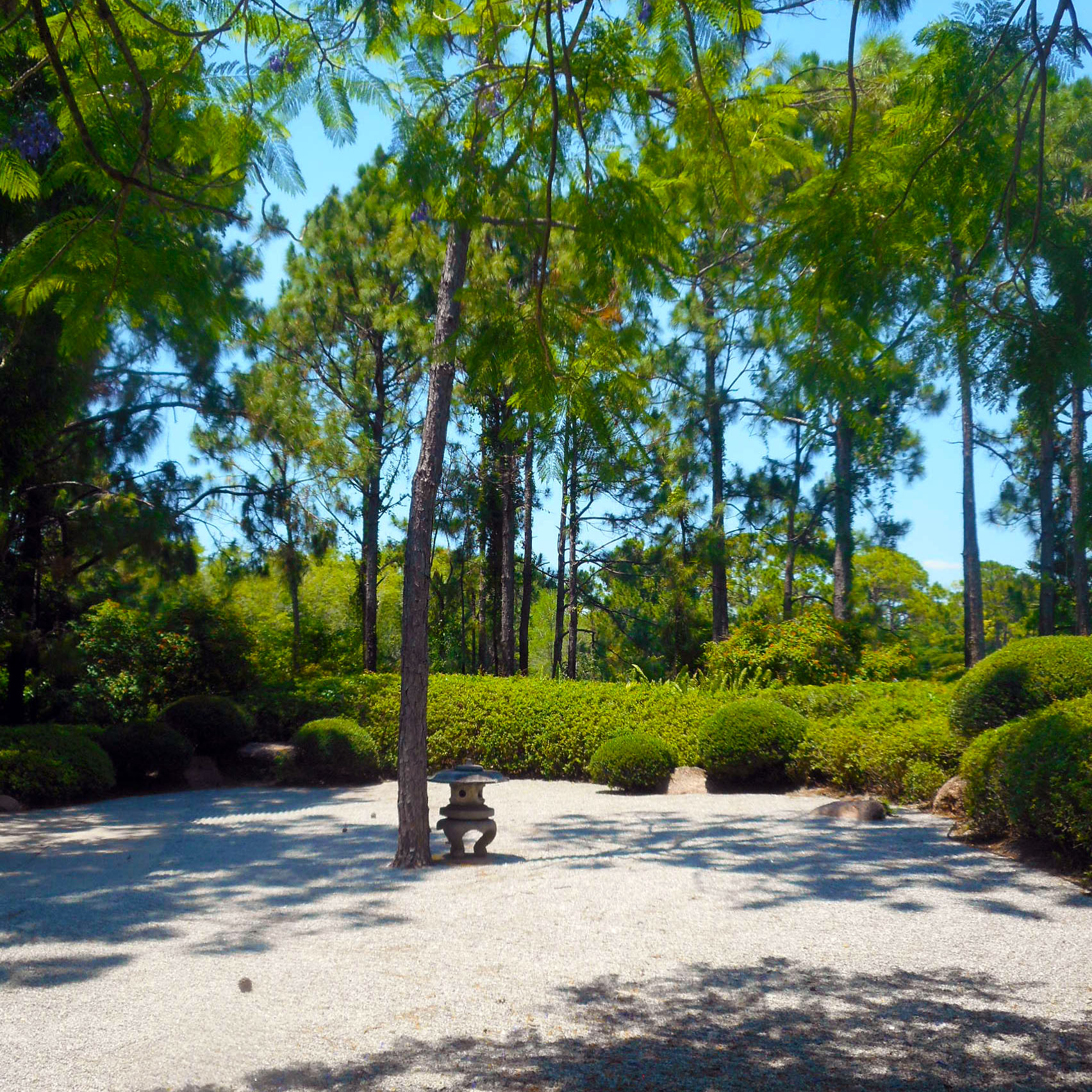
View of Flat Garden

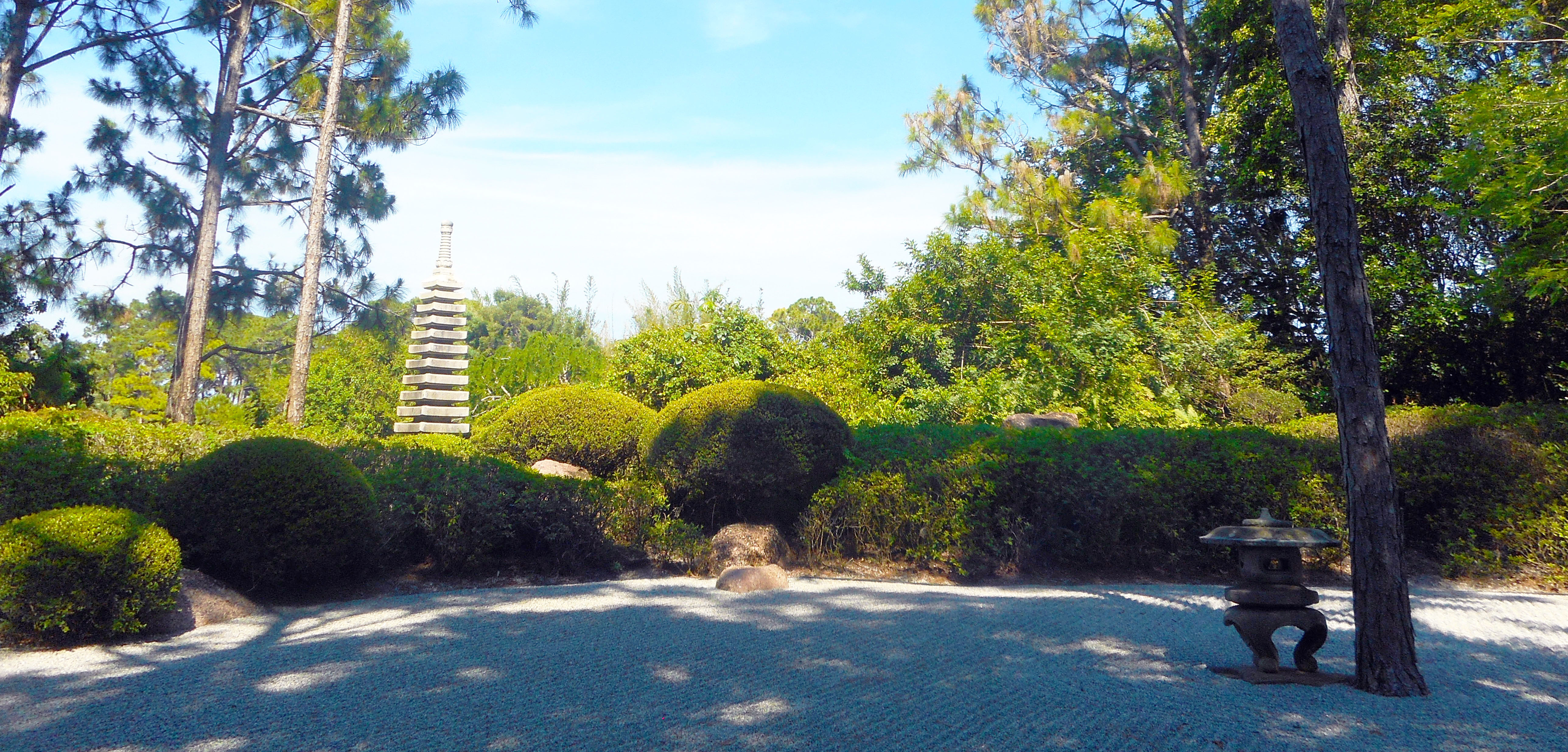
General View Cloudy

== Modern Romantic Gardens ==
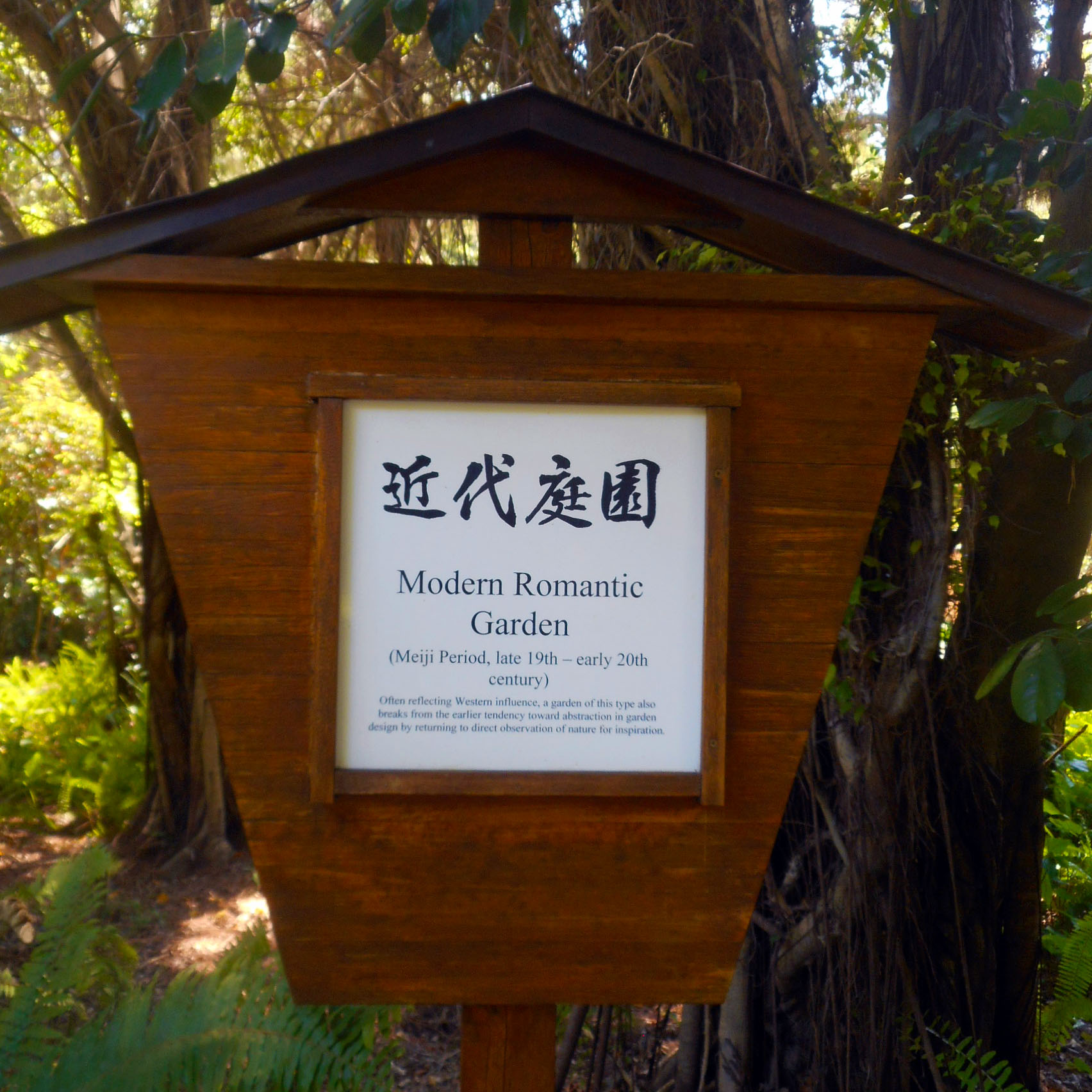
Modern Romantic Garden Sign

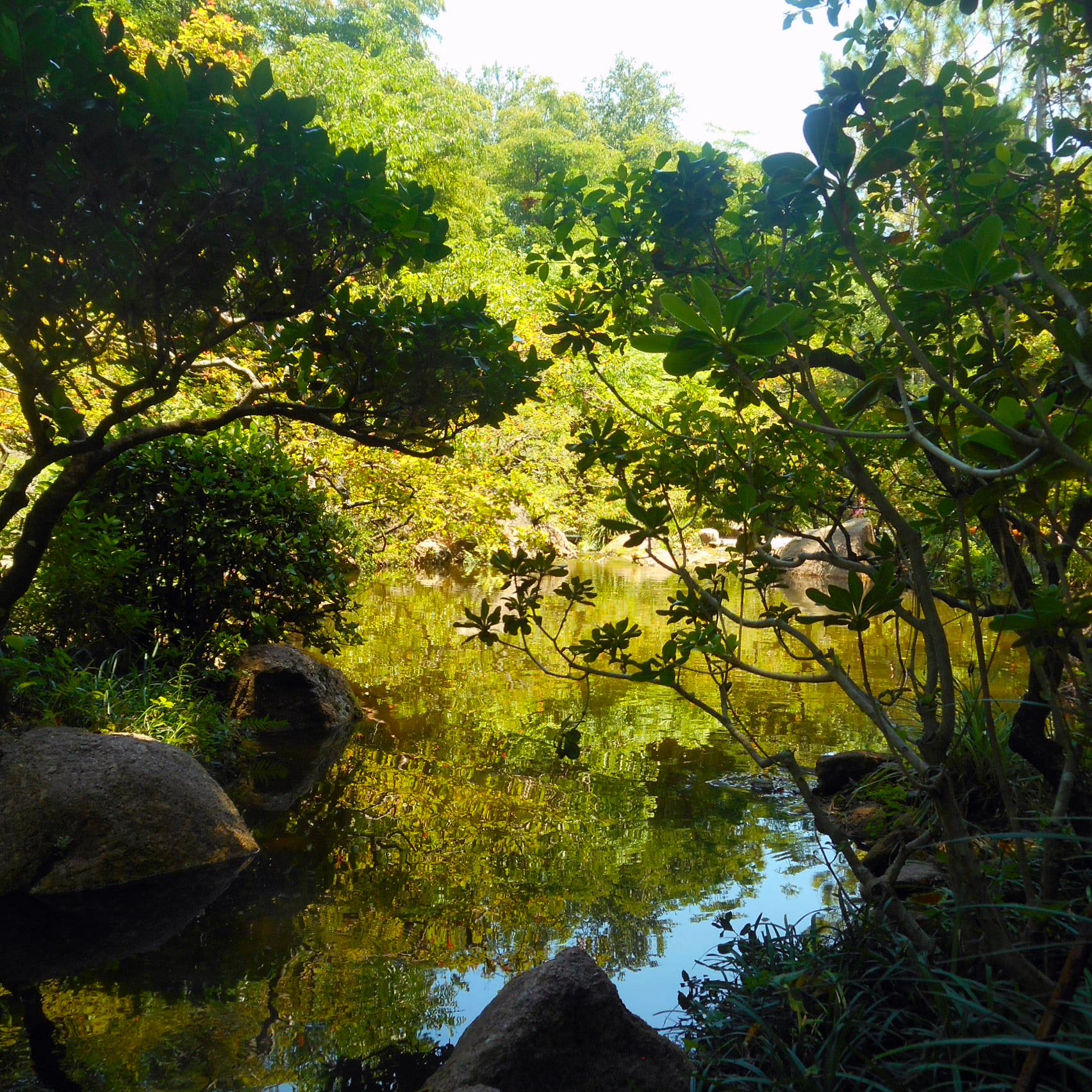
Creek and Plants

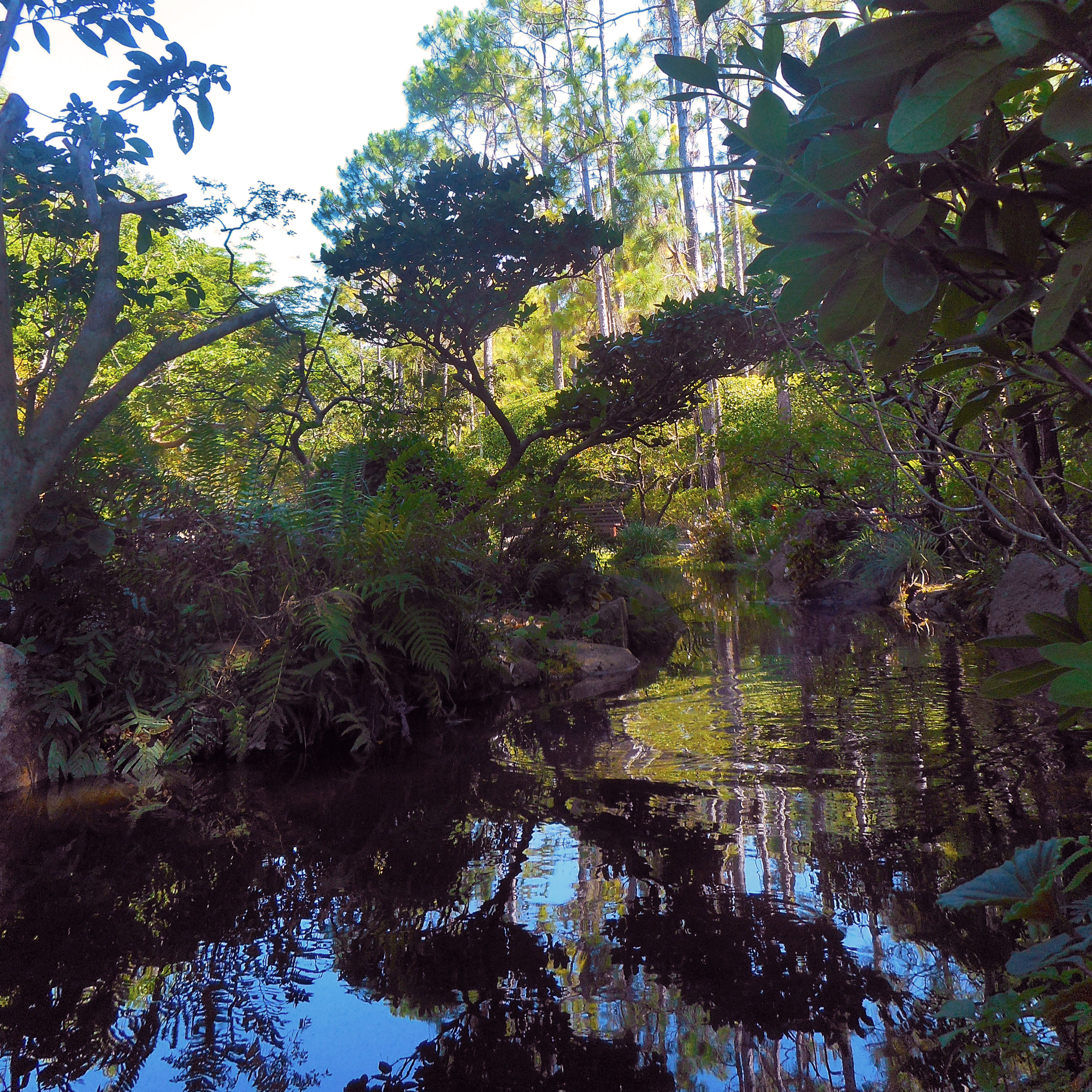
View of Creek and Plants

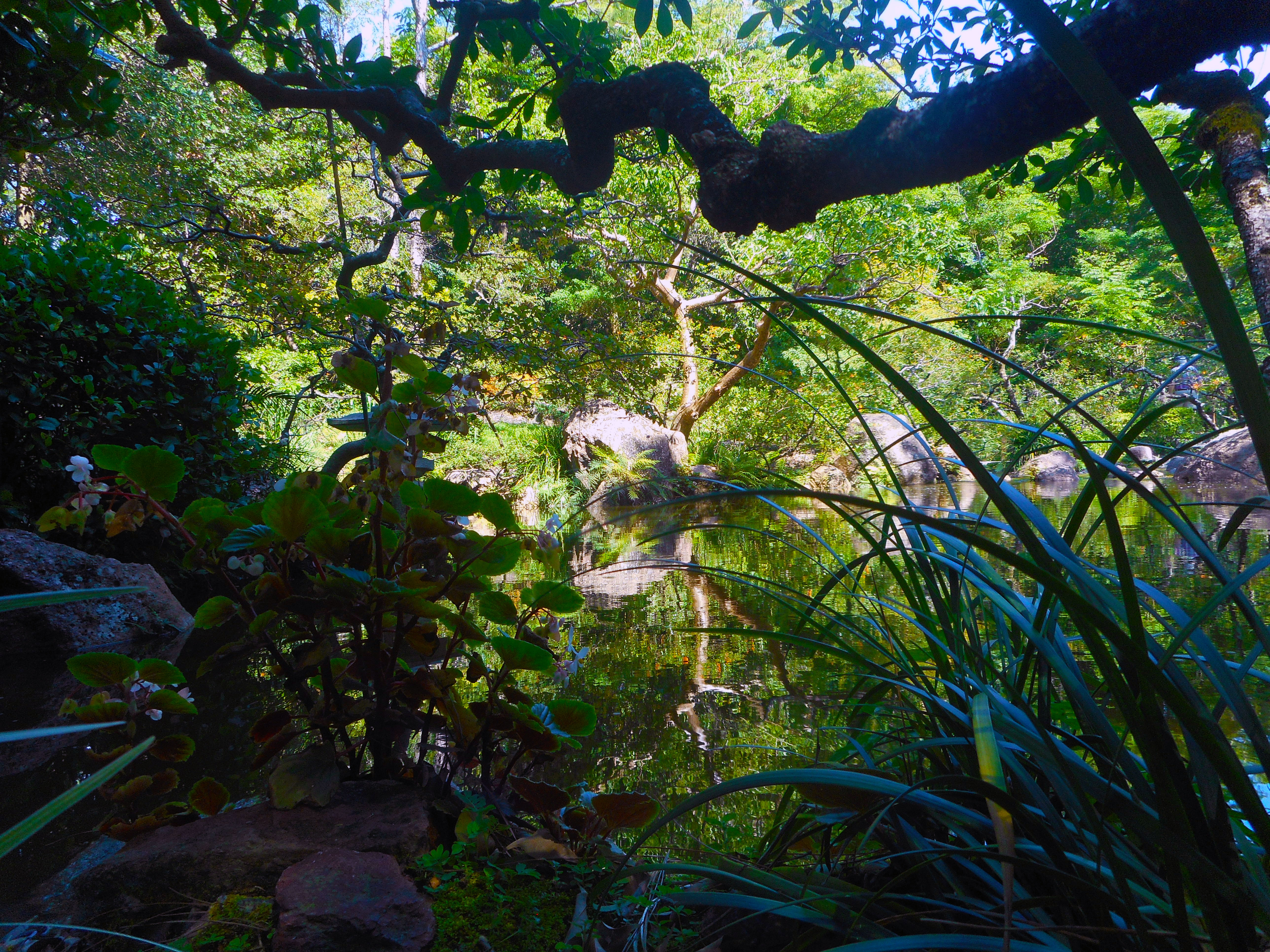
Pond Viewed Through Plants

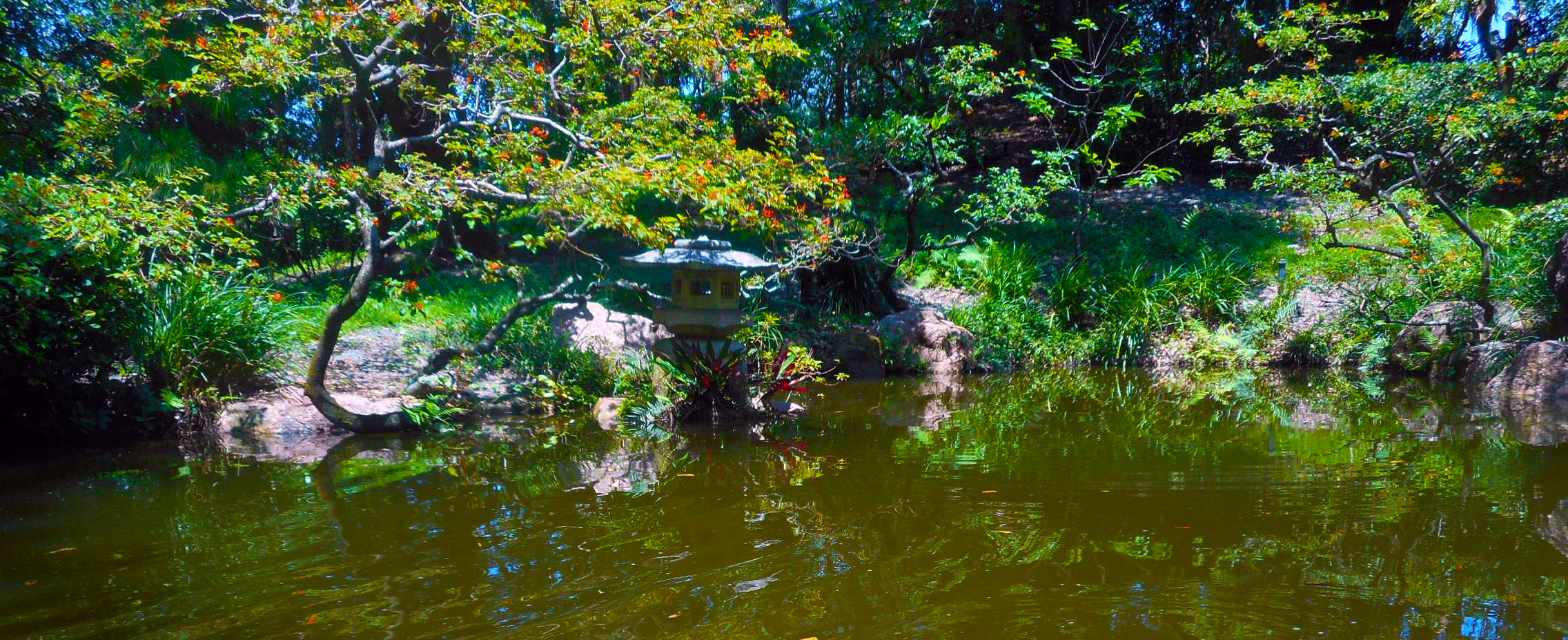
Pond and Stone Lantern

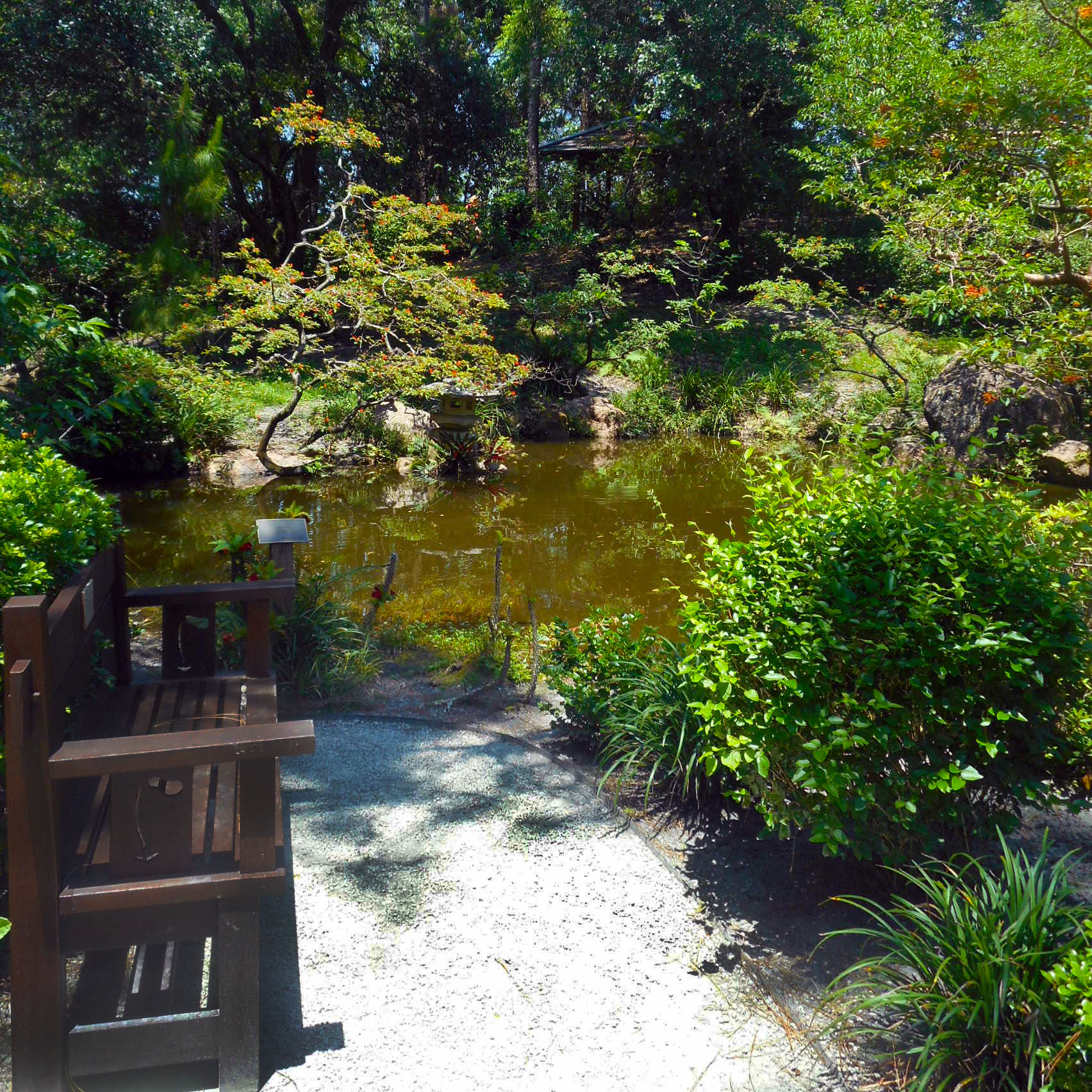
Seating Bench and Pond

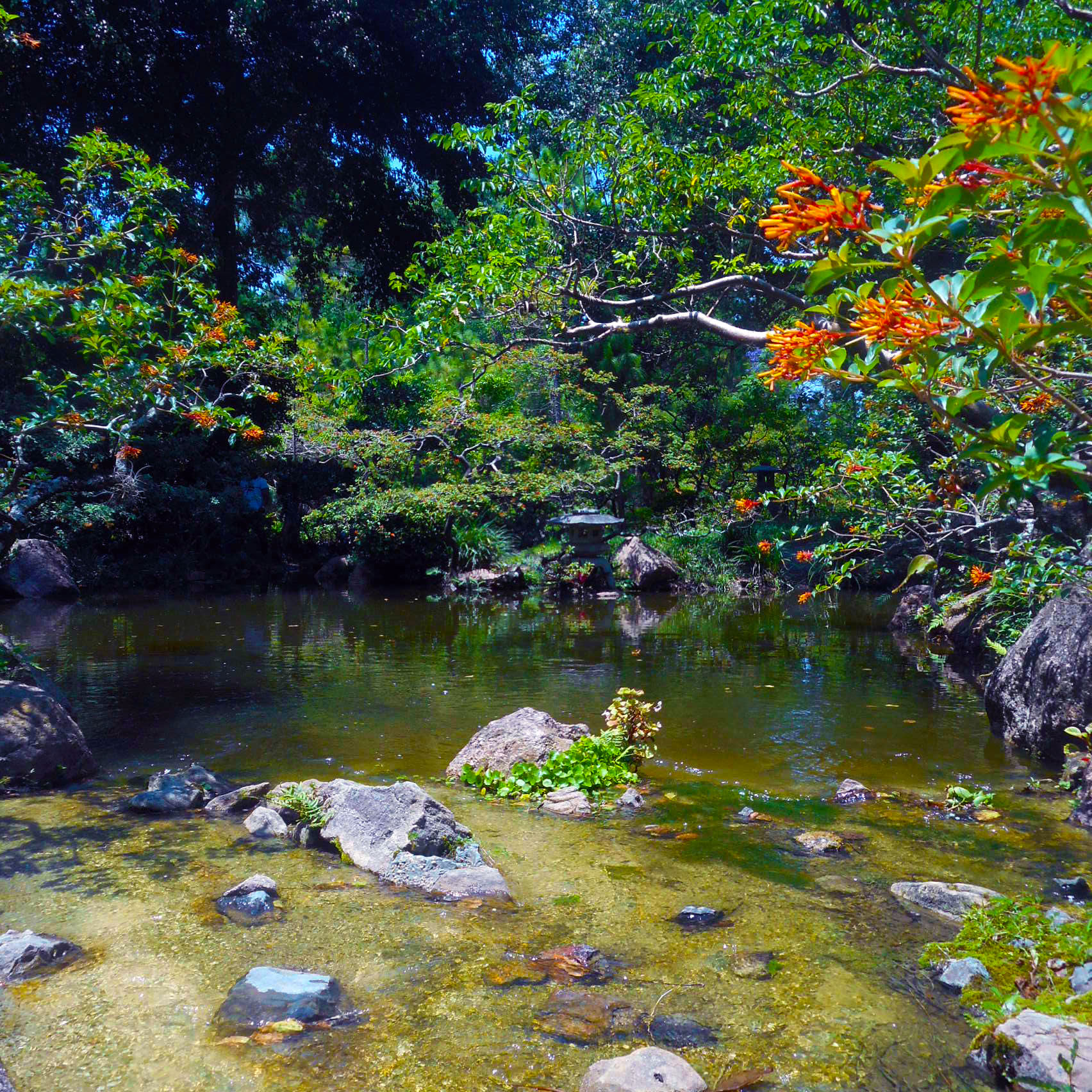
Creek Flowing Into Pond

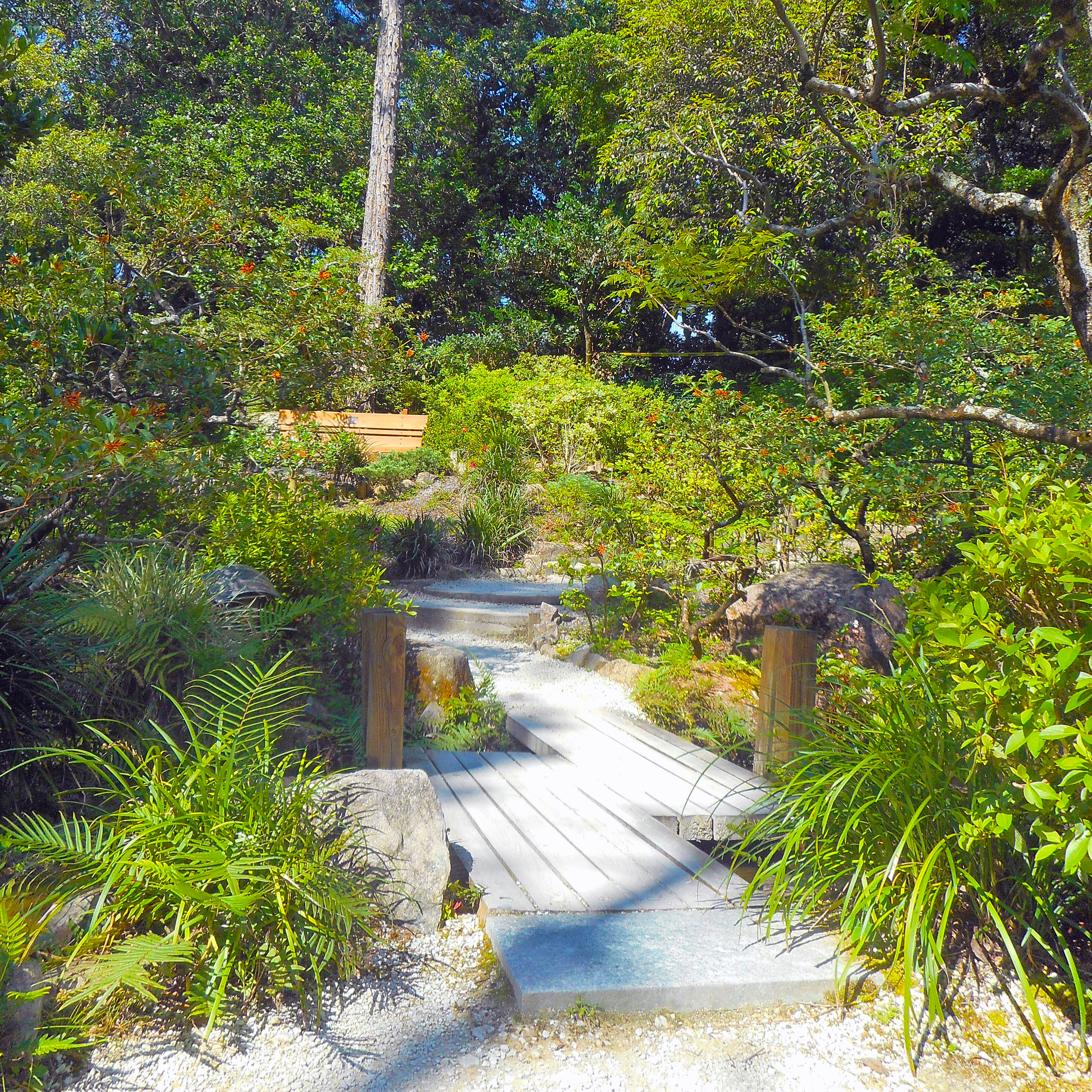
Wooden Plank Bridge over Creek

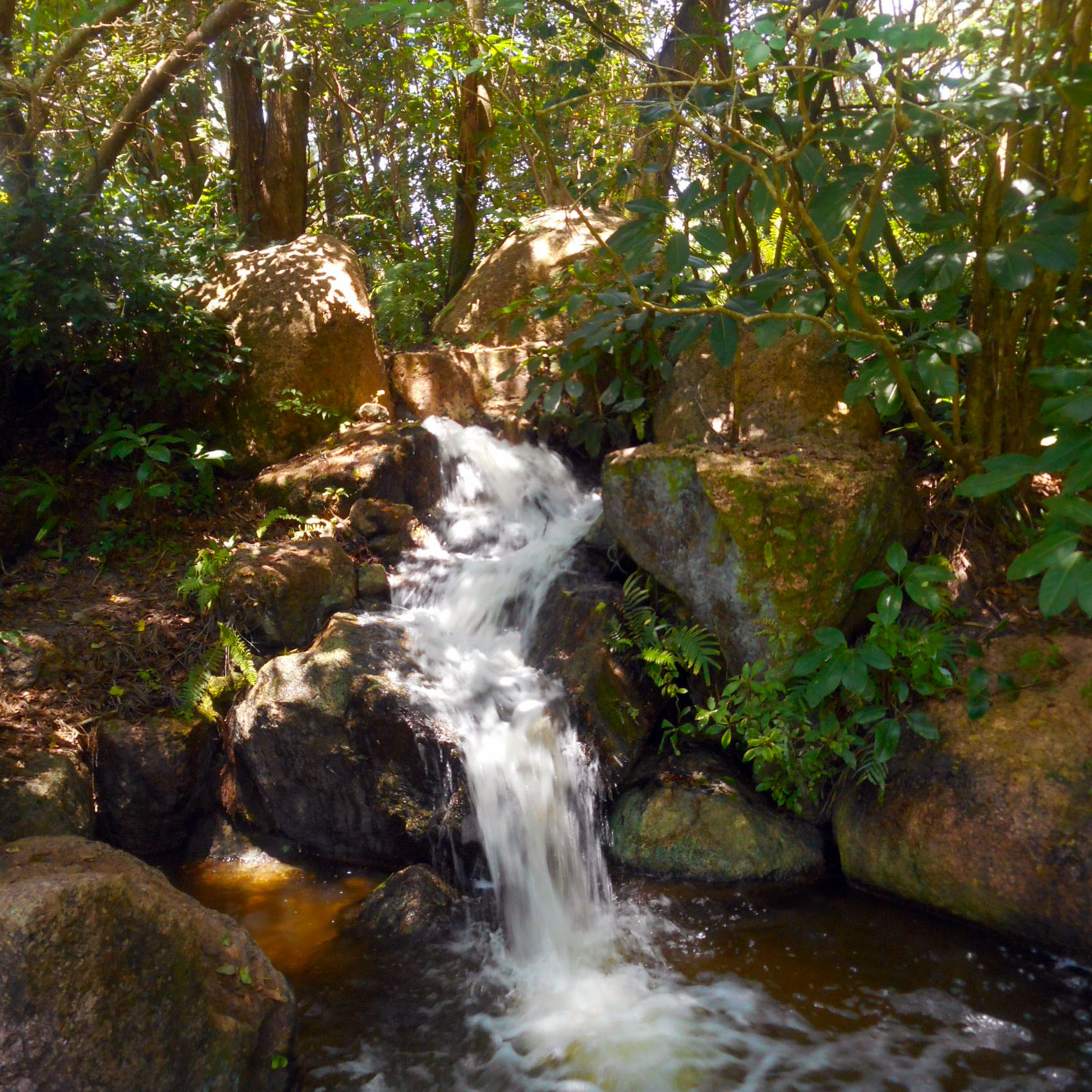
Cascading Waterfall

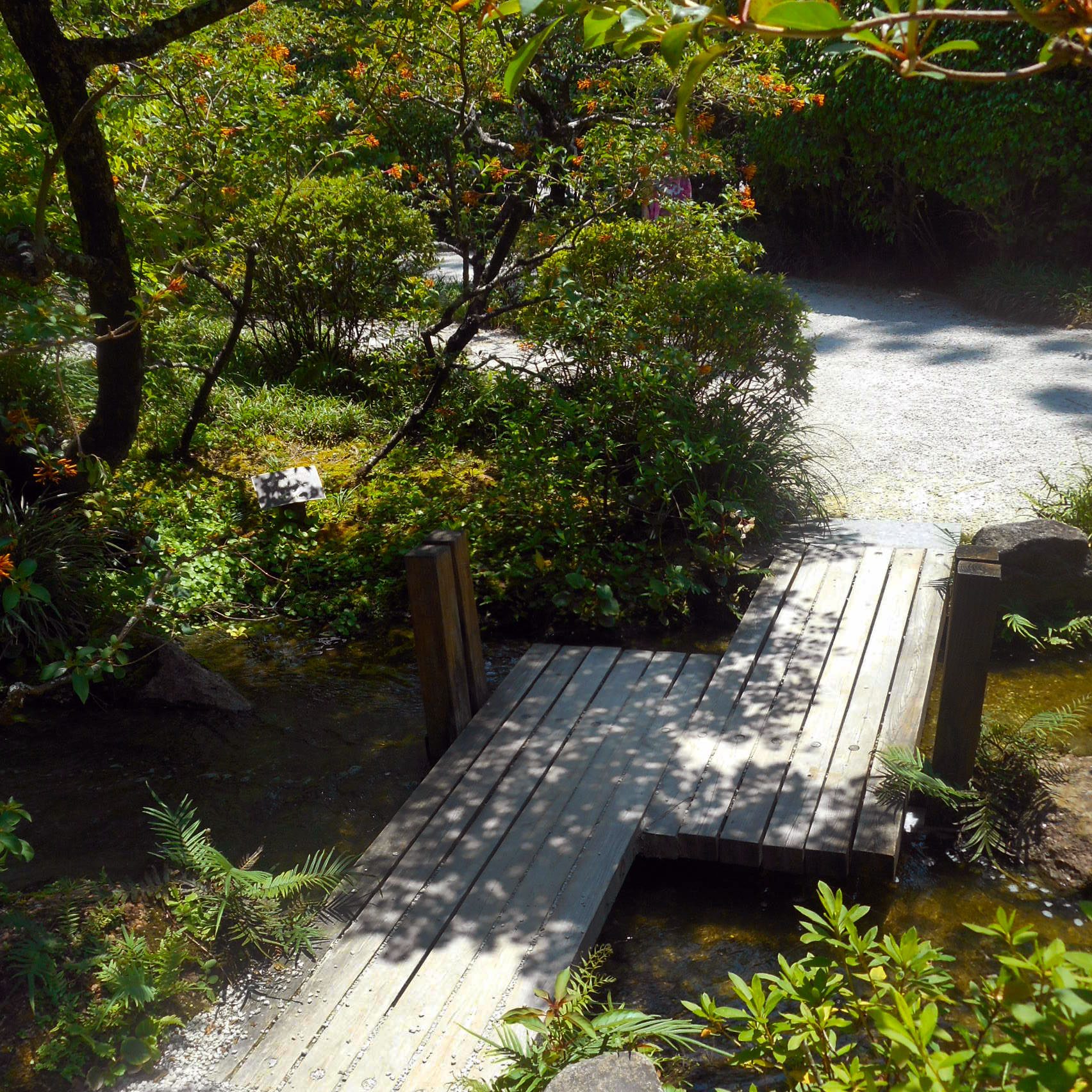
View of Plank Bridge from Above

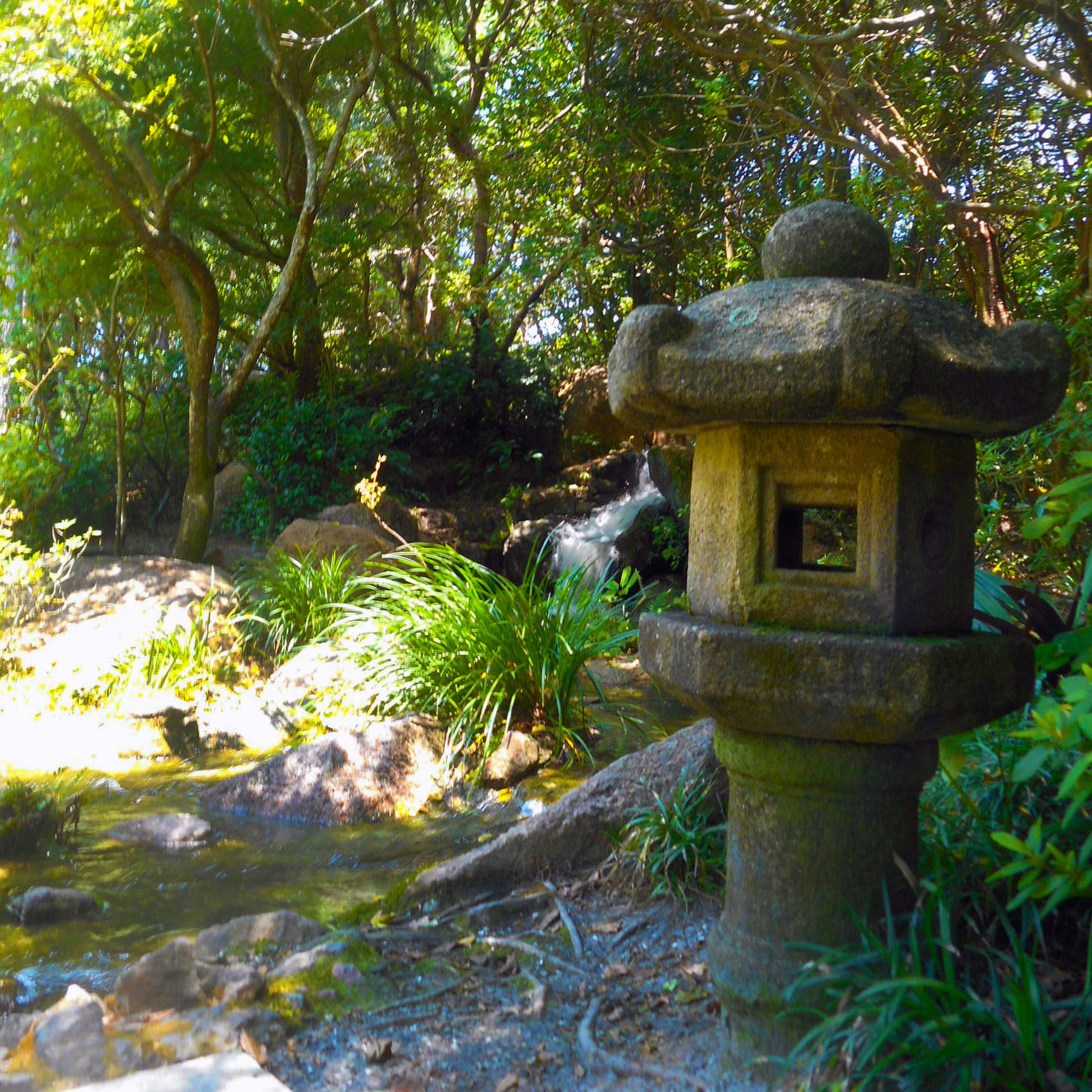
Stone Lantern and Waterfall

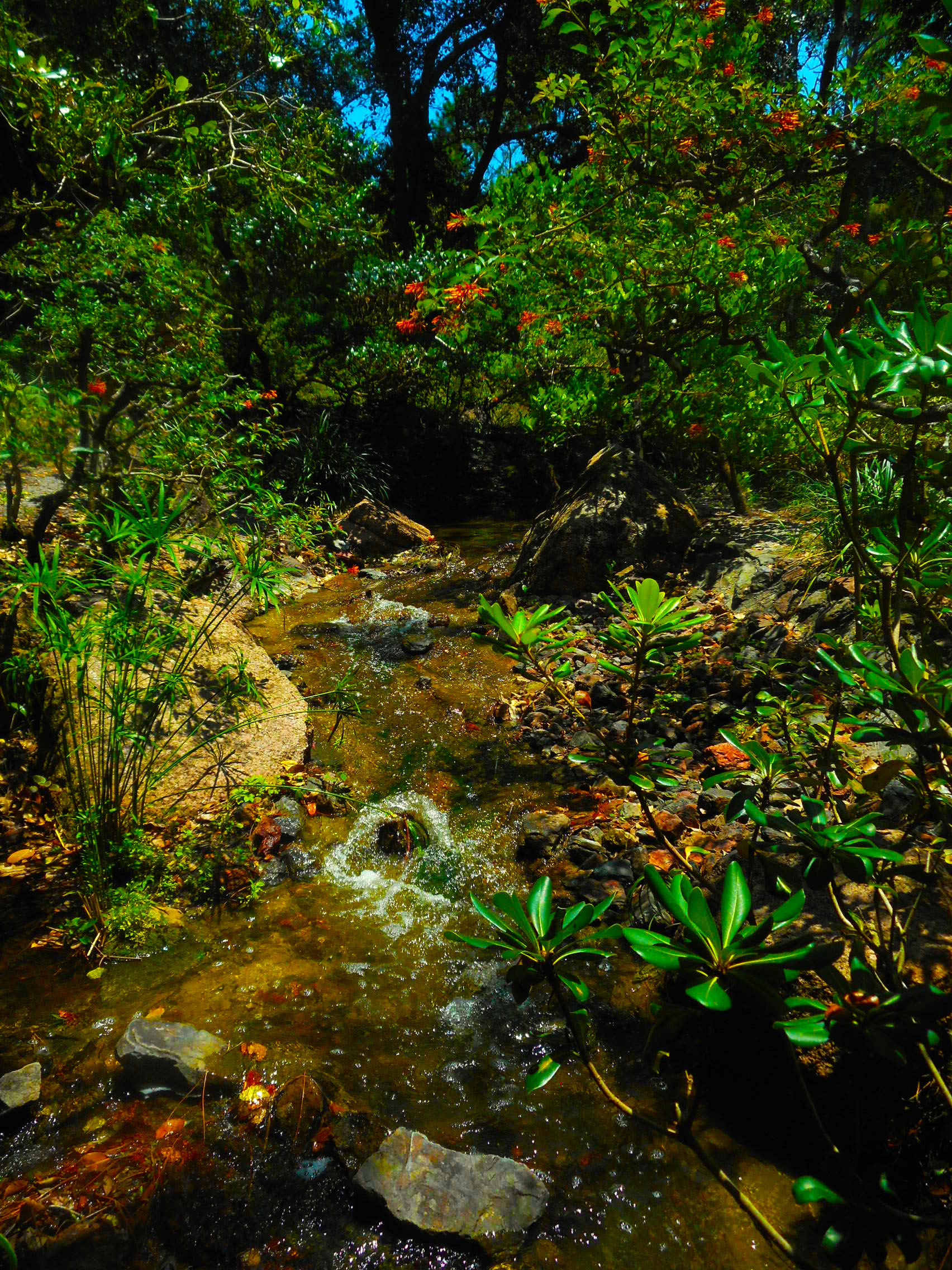
Flowing Creek and Plants

== Yamato Island ==
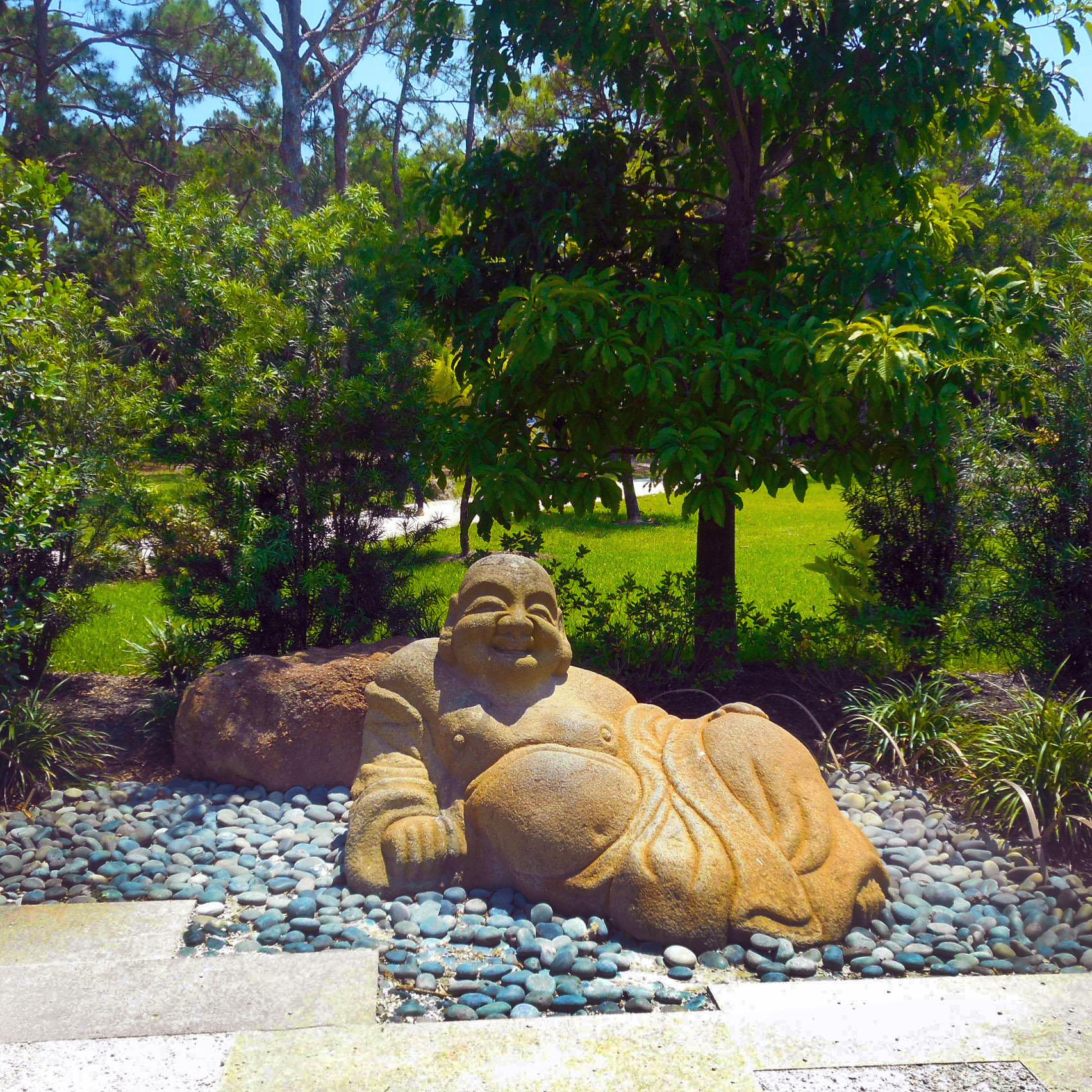
Hotei (Buddha) the god of Happiness

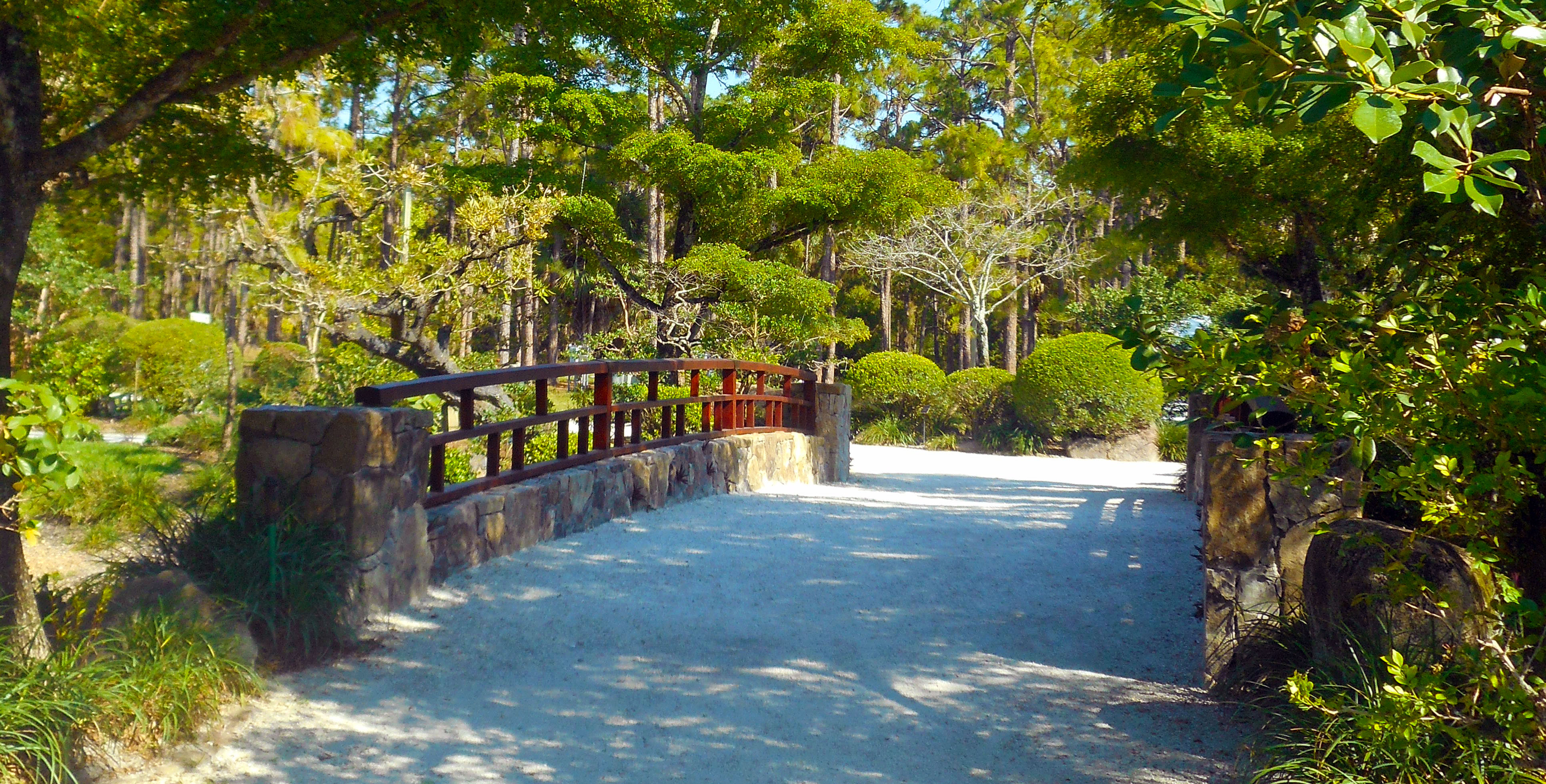
Yamato-kan Bridge

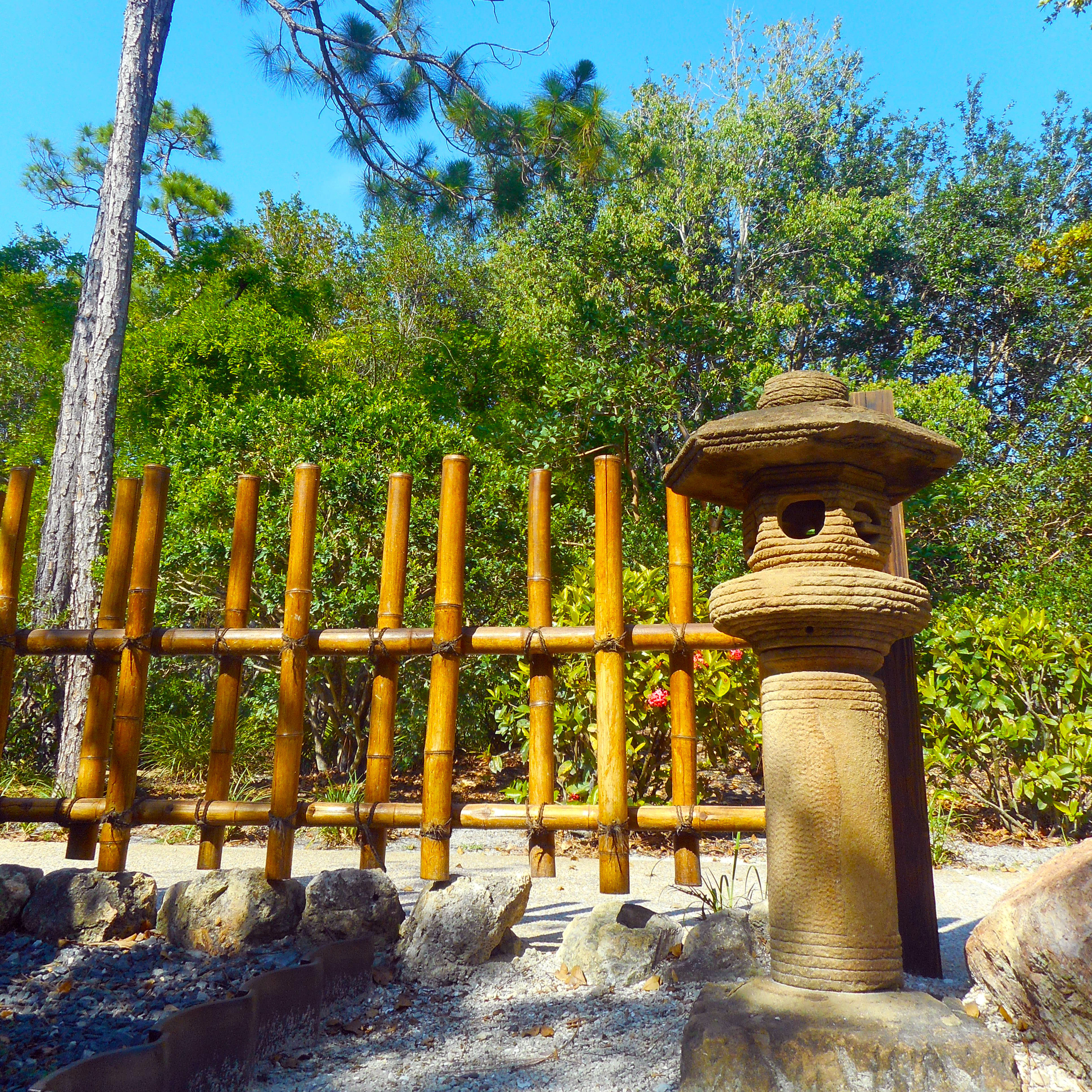
Stone Lantern at Entrance to Bonzai Garden

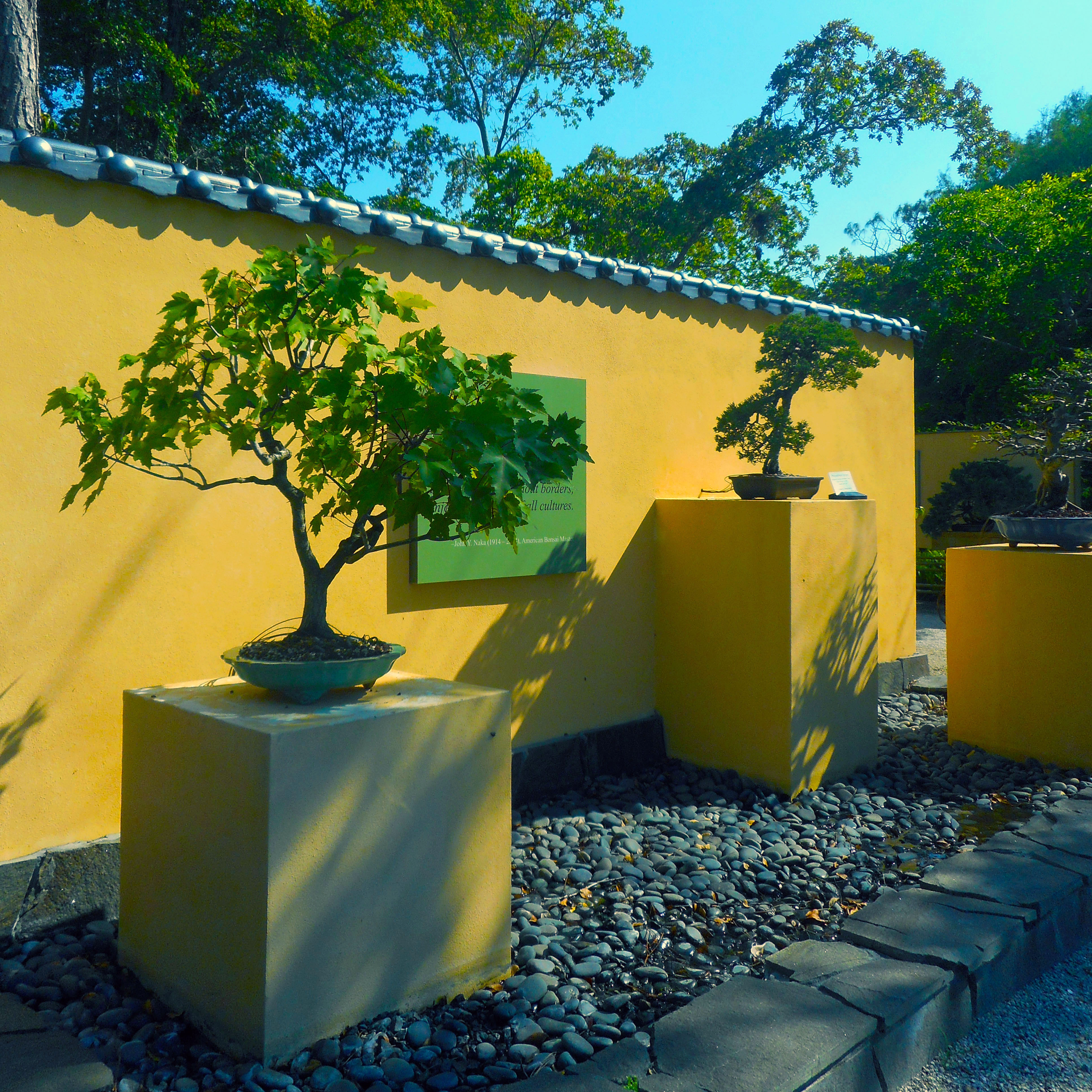
Bonzai Garden

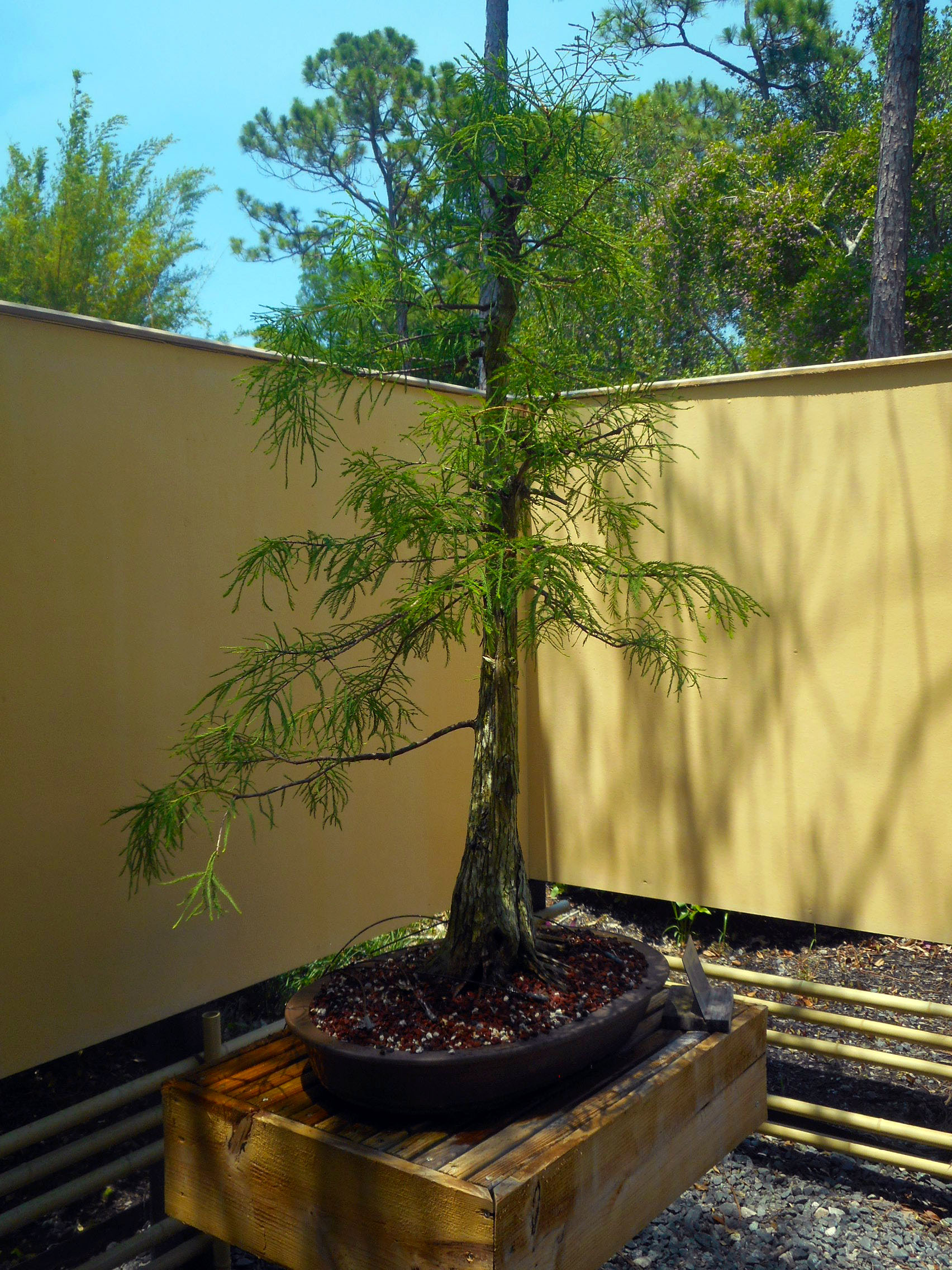
Cypress

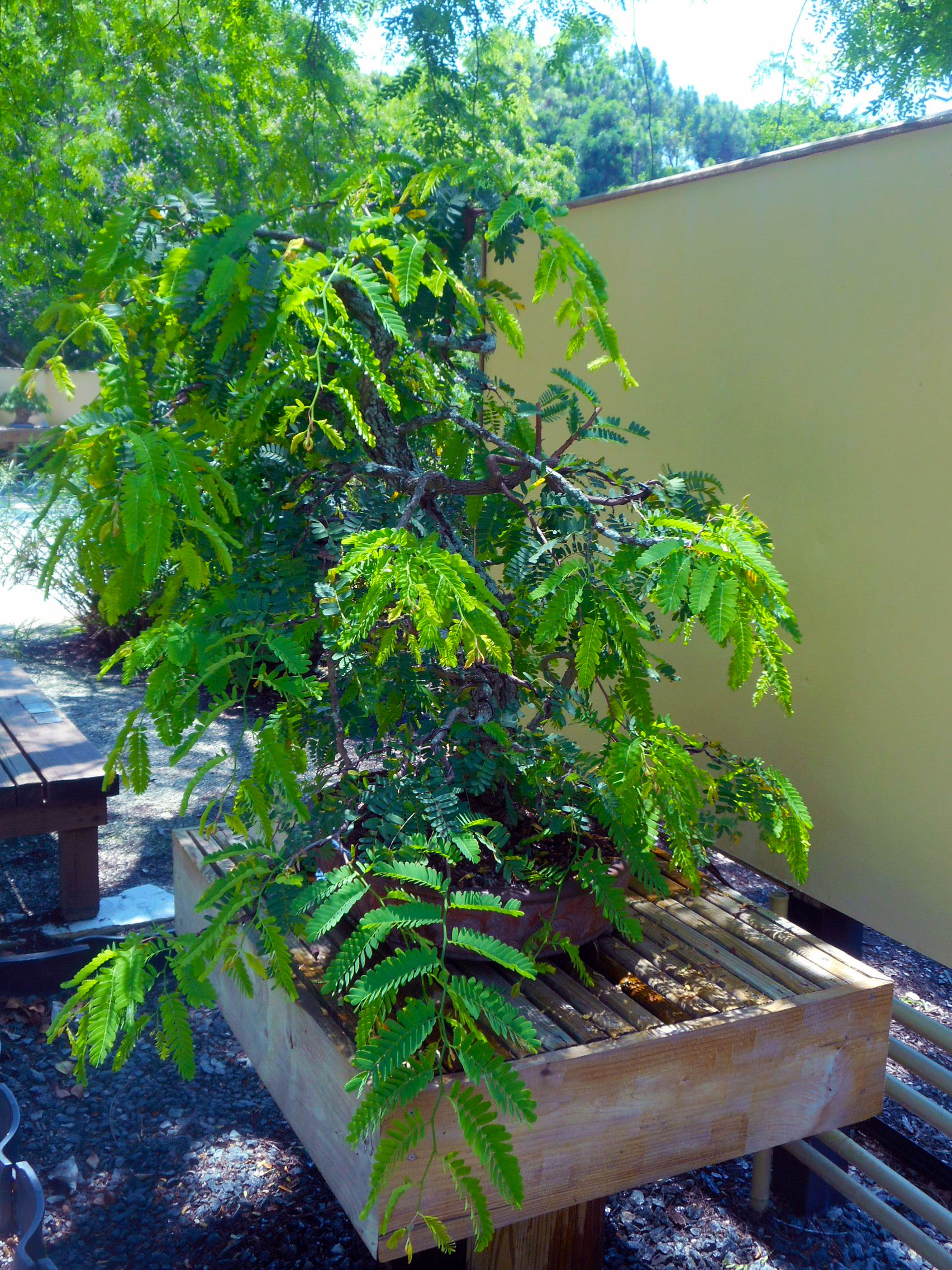
Tamarind

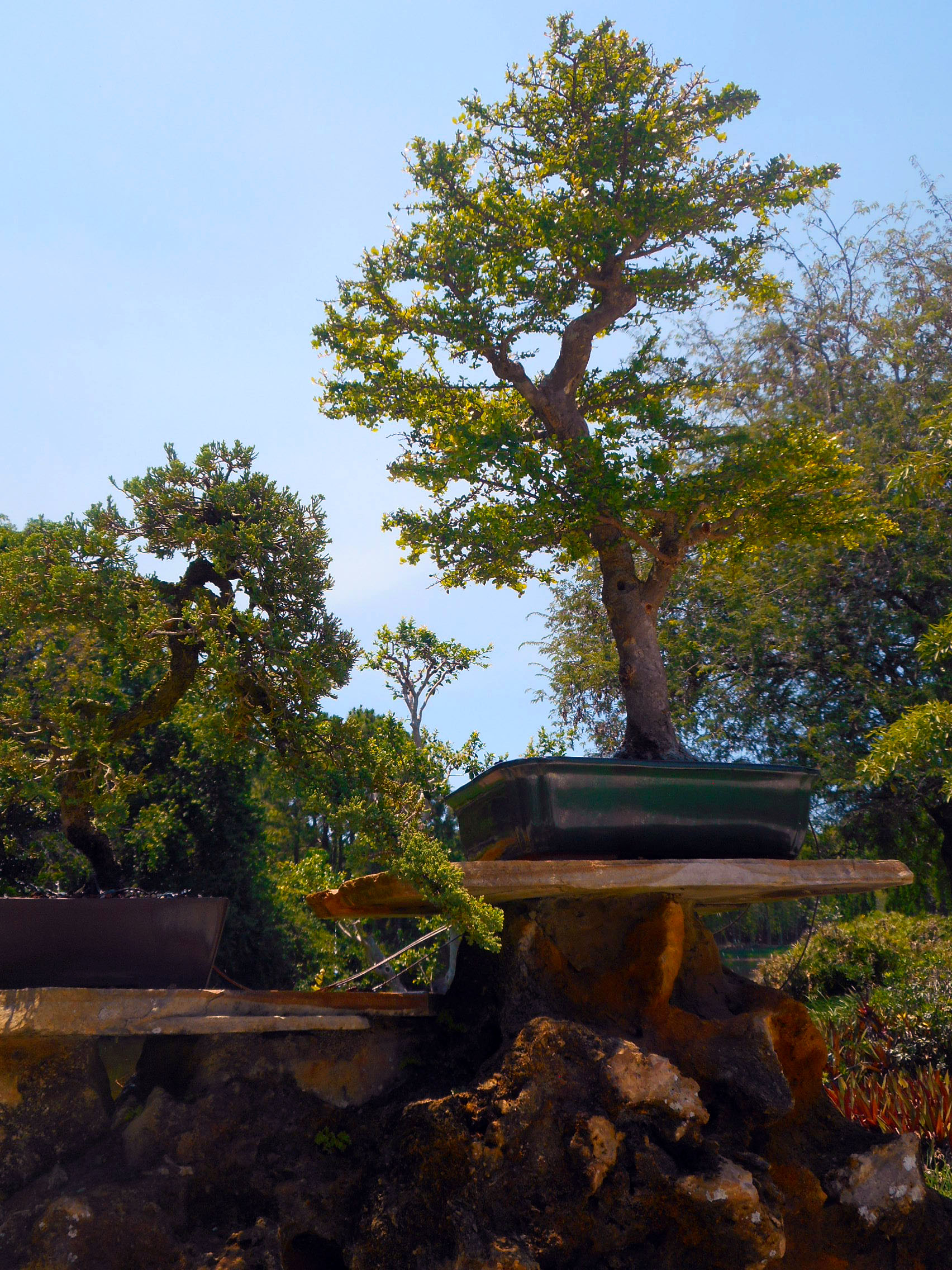
Bonsai Trees

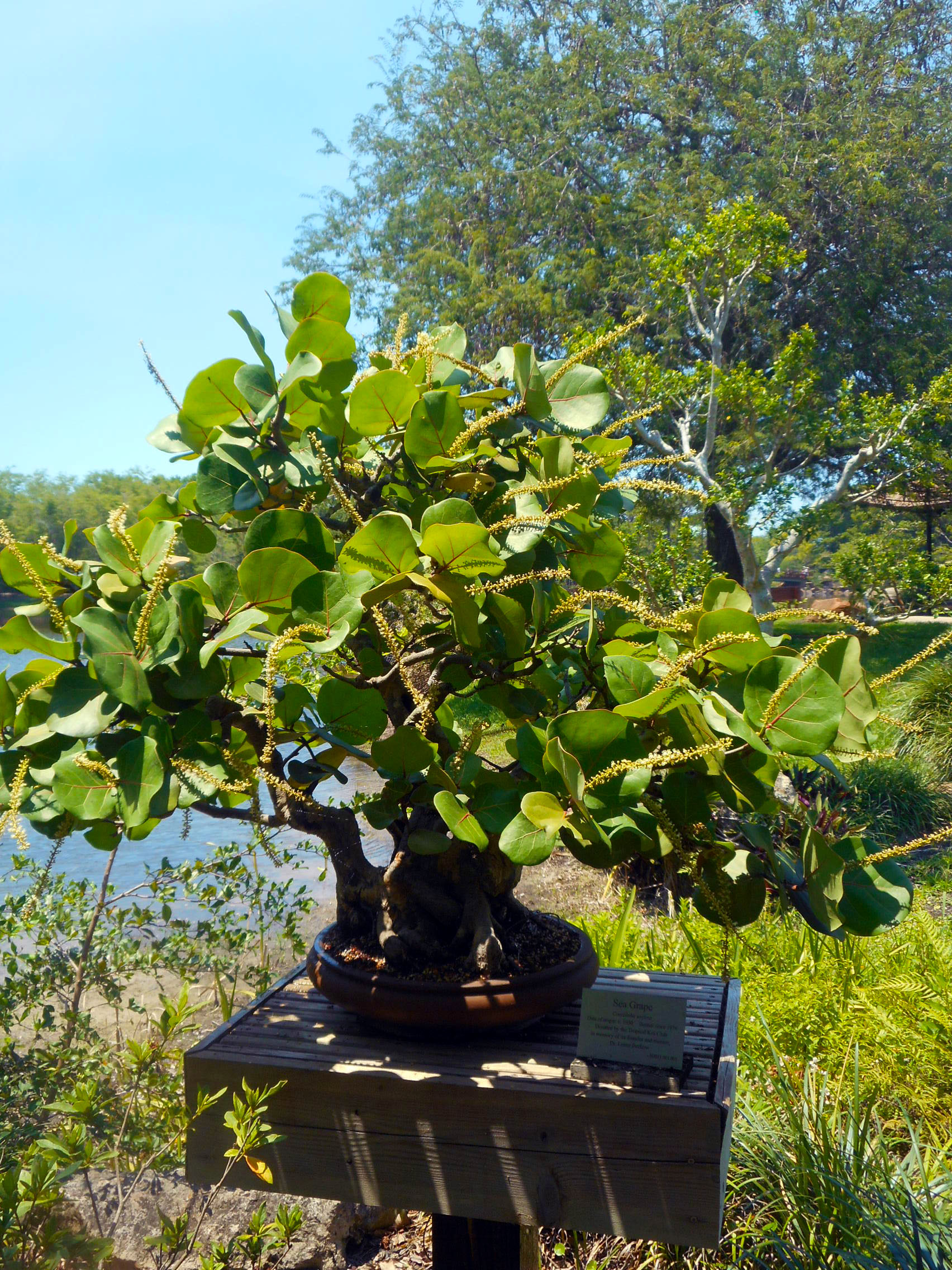
Seagrape

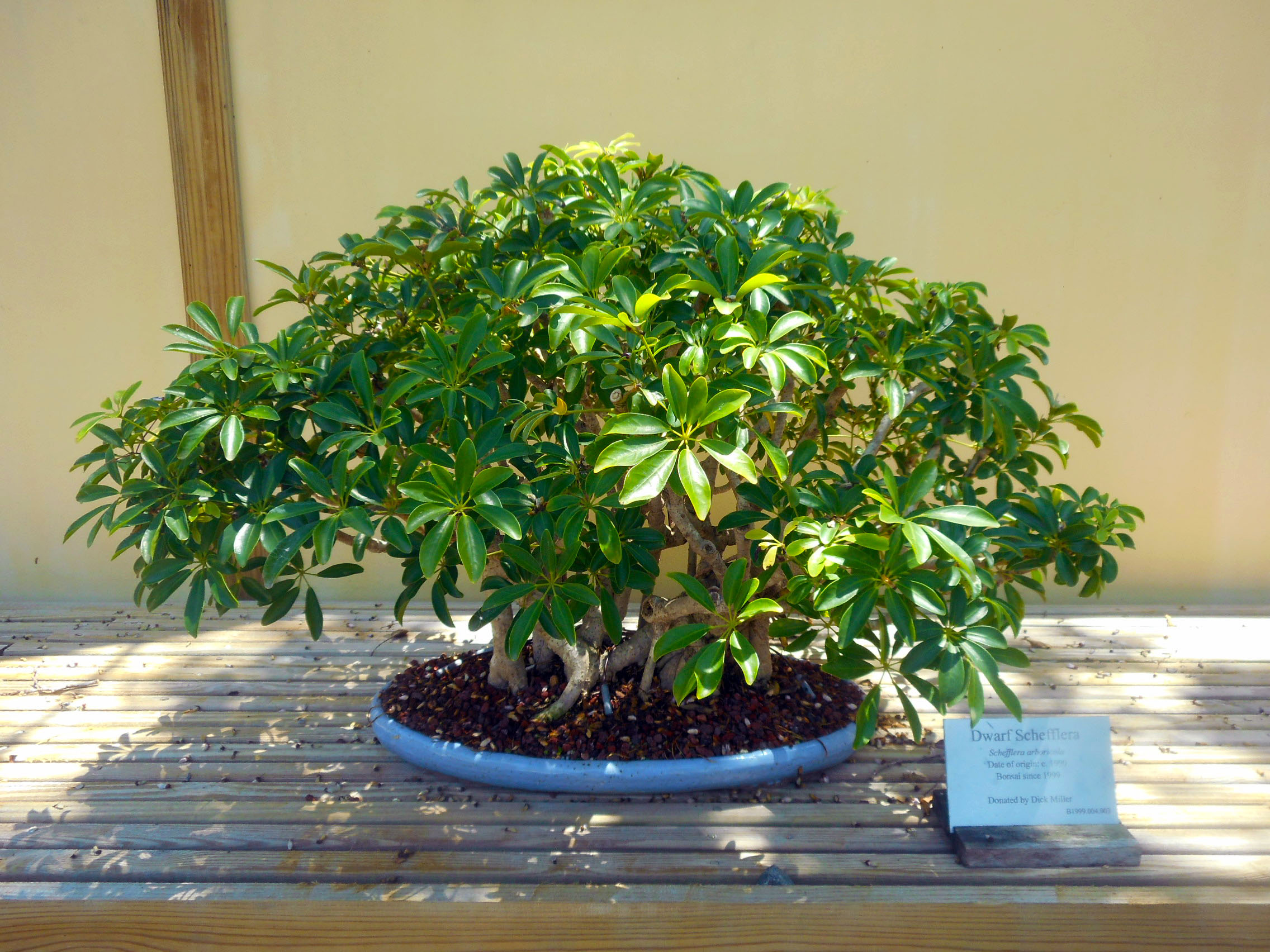
Dwarf Schefflera

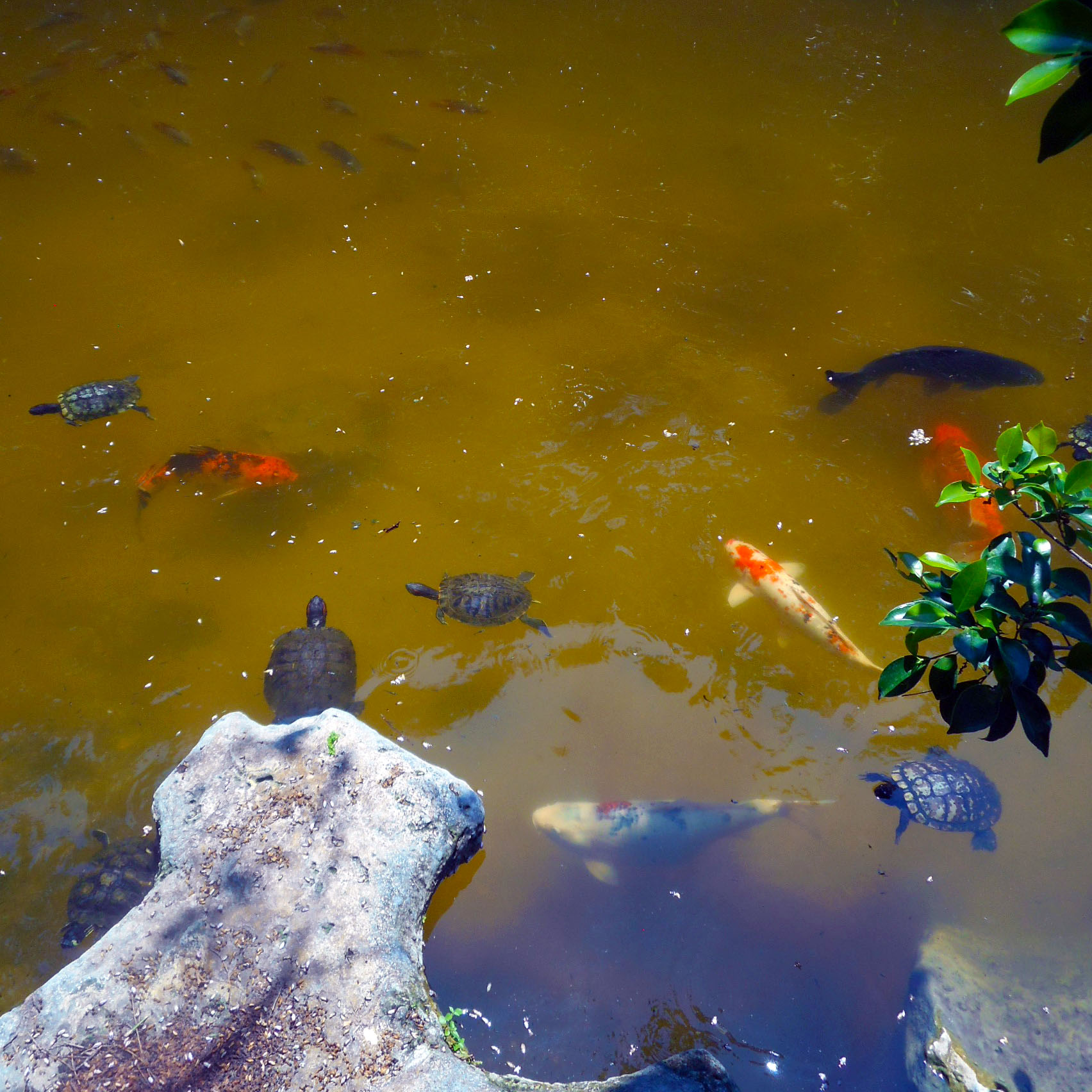
Koi and Turtles in Pond

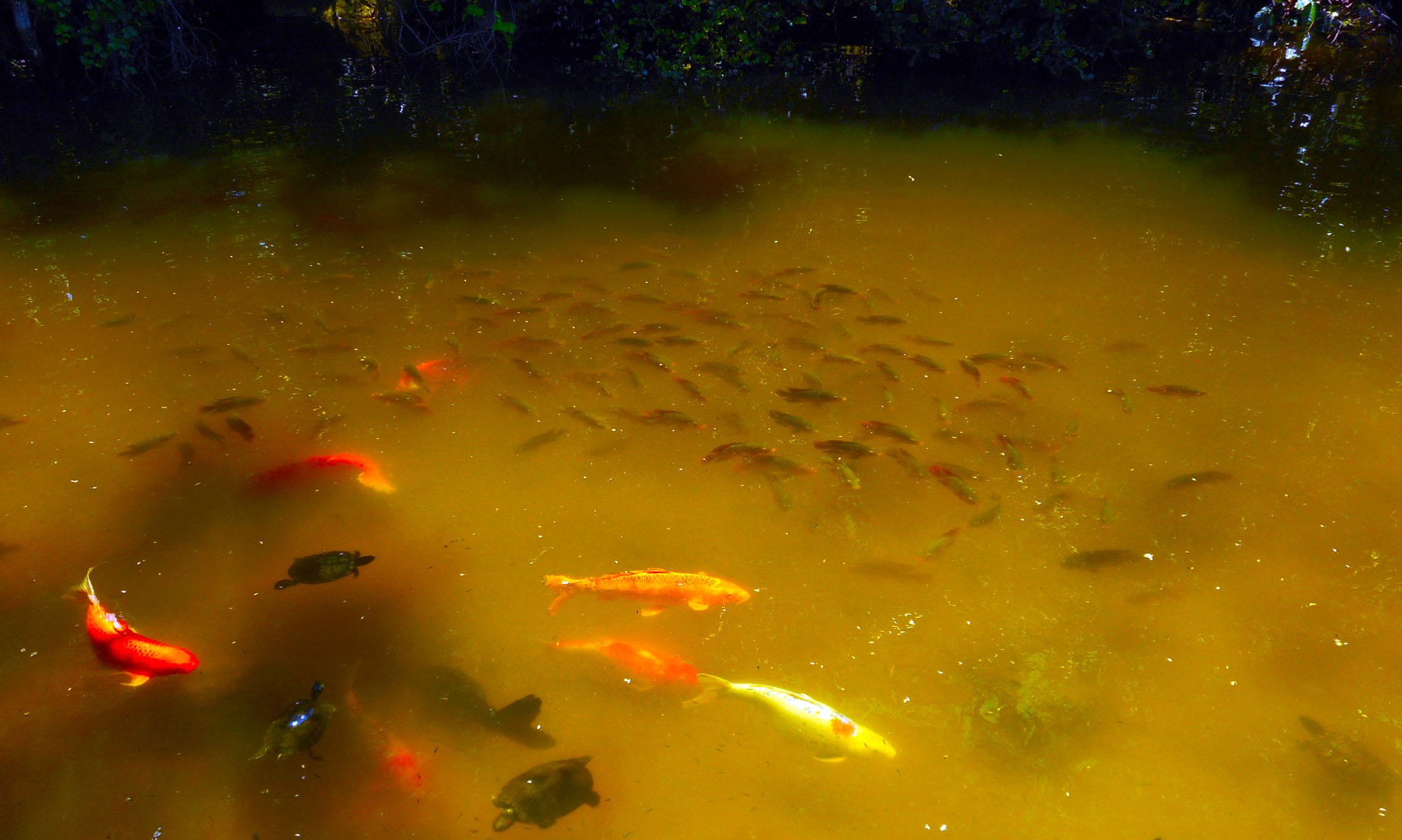
Koi and Turtles

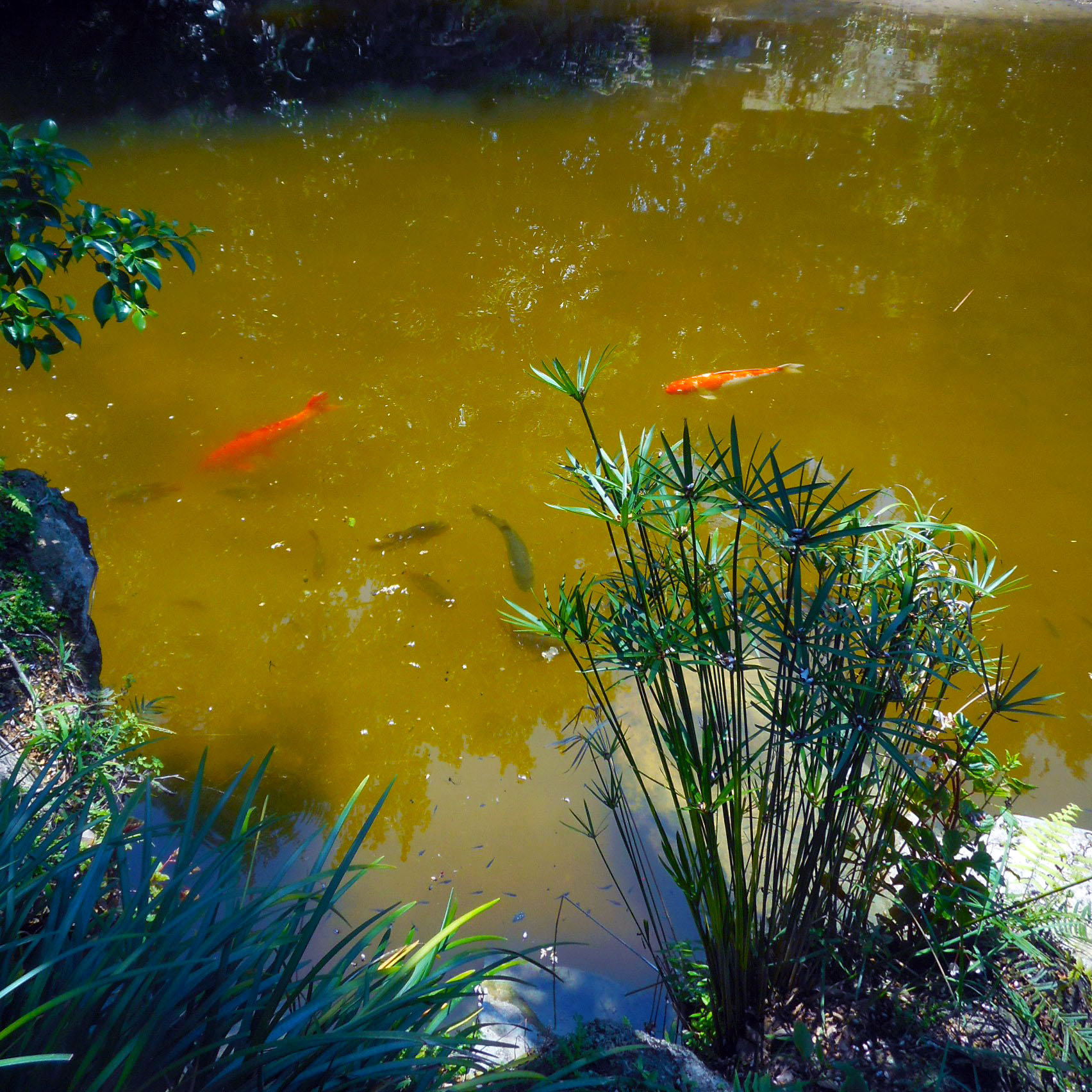
Koi and Turtles and Papyrus Reeds

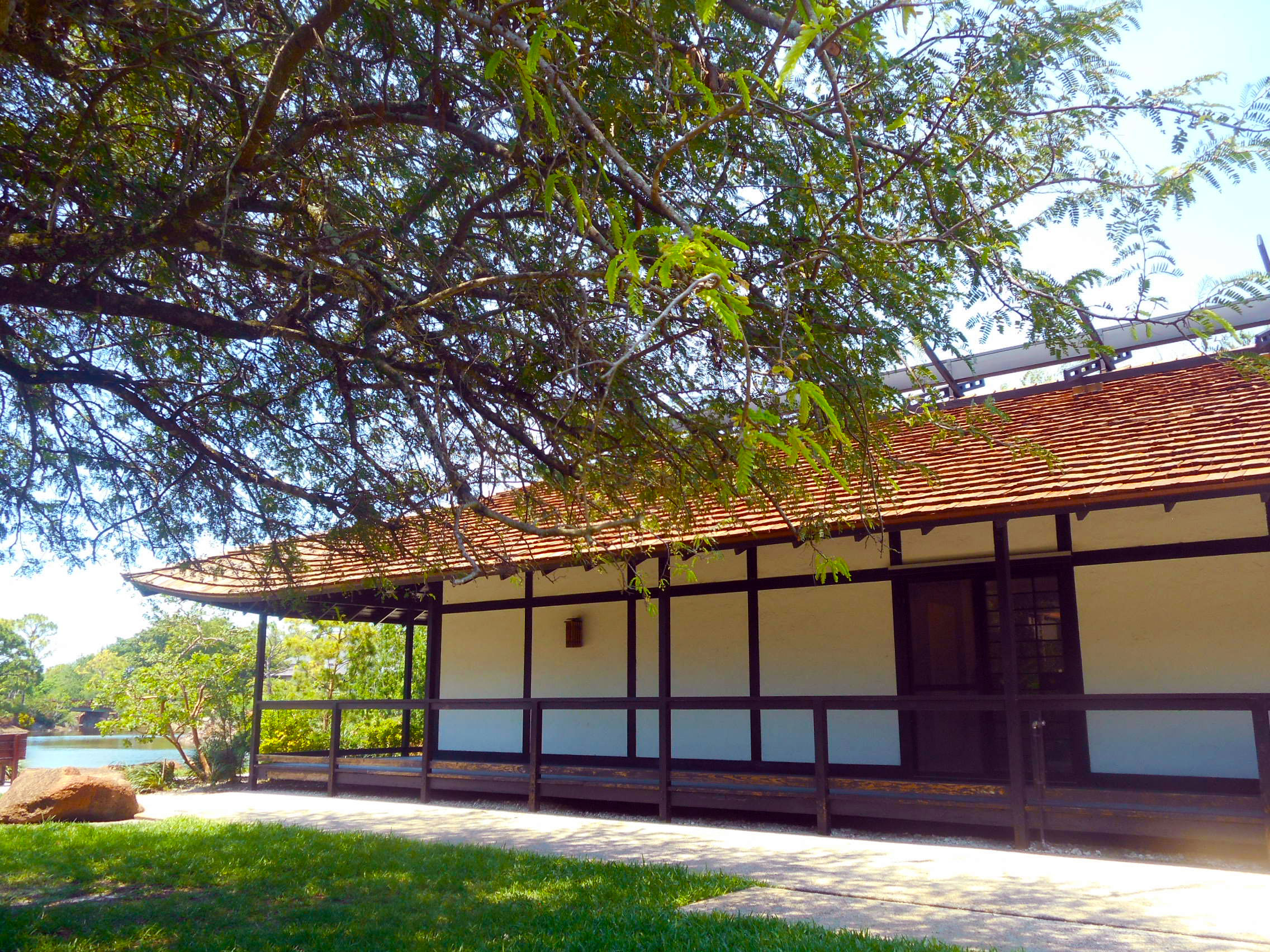
Tamarind Tree and Tea House

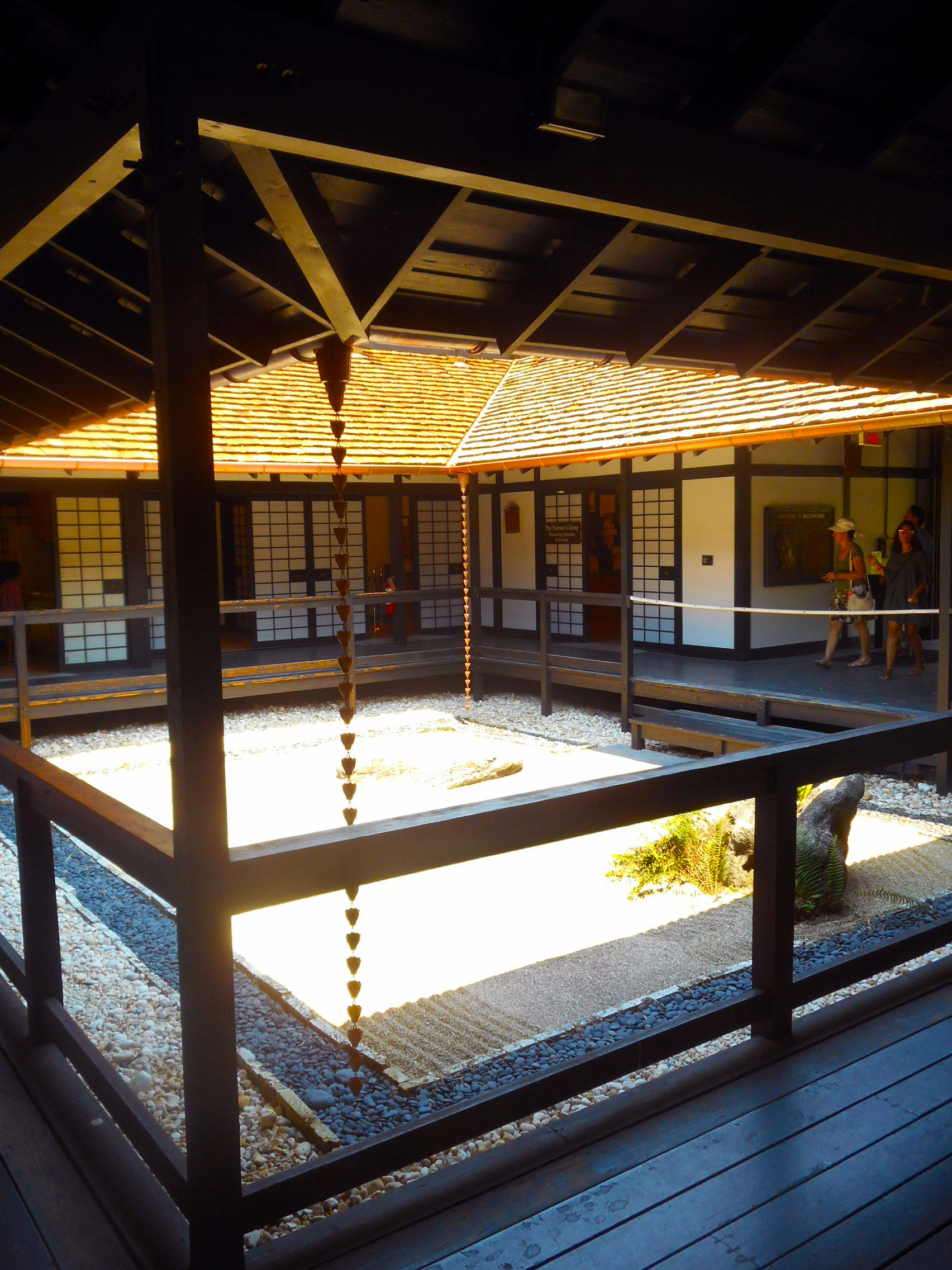
Interior Rock and Sand Garden of Tea House

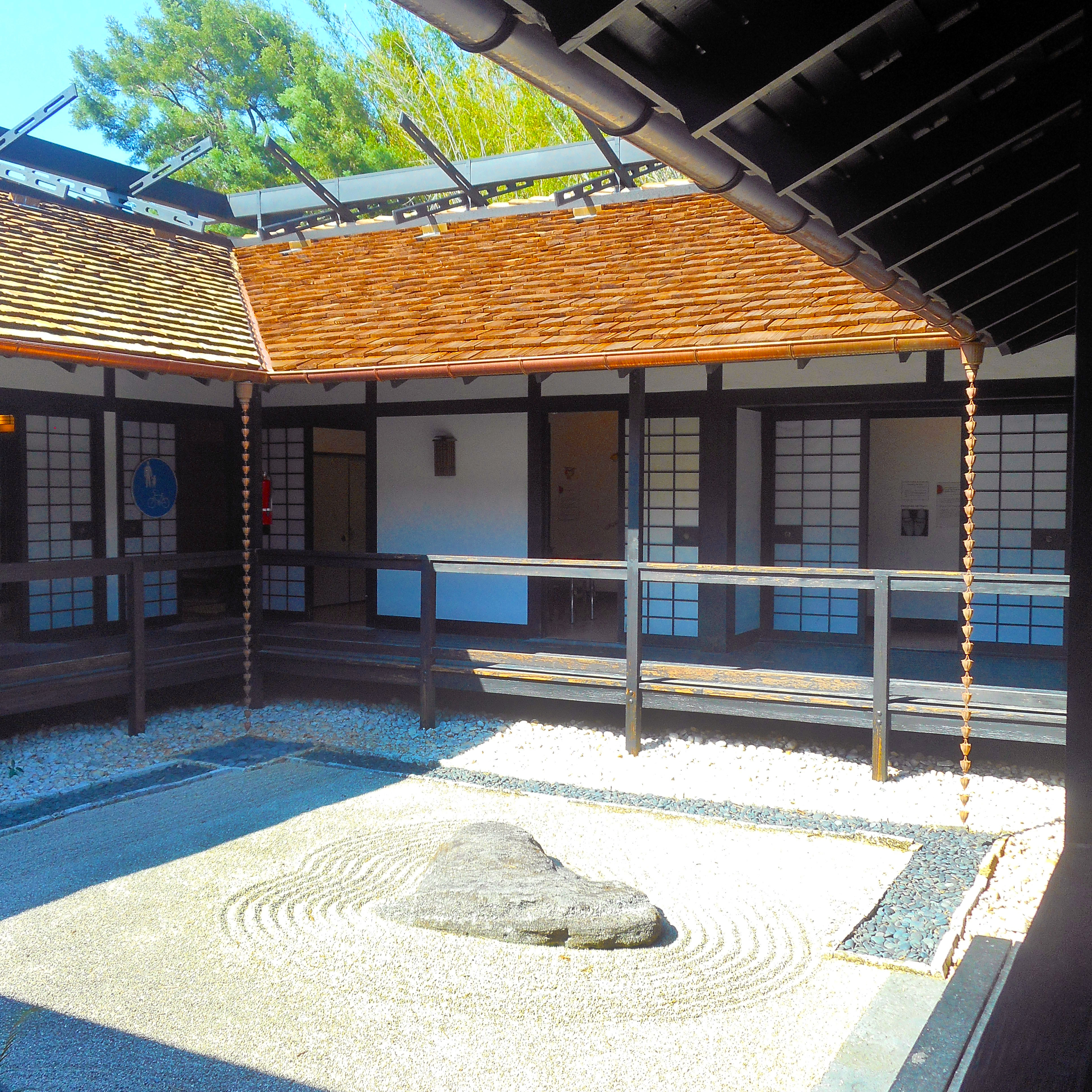
Interior Garden

== Garden construction phases ==
Today's gardens were built in two phases. Phase One (completed in 1999) built the Yamato-kan pavilion, an historic stone lantern, a tsukubai (water basin), bonsai display, Allen S. Austin Memorial Waterfall (designed by Carn Reid), a kame shima (turtle island), a Challenger Memorial Lantern, Yamato Island, the Morikami Falls, the Wisdom Ring, a dry creek garden and part of the seven acres (2.8 hectares) lake. The ishidoro lantern was originally erected in 1681 at Toshogu Shrine in Edo as a memorial to Ietsuna, the fourth Tokugawa shōgun. The Wisdom Ring is a replica of a stone lantern (ishidoro) located in Delray Beach's sister city in Japan, Miyazu. Phase Two (completed 2001) opened the six gardens.

== See also ==
- List of botanical gardens in the United States
