= List of Japanese gardens in the United States =

This list of Japanese gardens in the United States contains gardens, museums, institutions and other organizations which features gardens designed and created in traditional Japanese style that are open to the public.

== Gardens ==
Name	Town/City	State	Summary
Anderson Japanese Gardens	Rockford	Illinois	12 acres, established in 1978
Japanese Peace Garden	Moses Lake	Washington	4 acres
ABQ BioPark Botanic Garden	Albuquerque	New Mexico	Includes the four-acre Sasebo Japanese Garden designed by Toru Tanaka, opened in 2007
Asticou Azalea Garden	Northeast Harbor	Maine	2.3 acres, styled after a Japanese stroll garden
Atlanta Botanical Garden	Atlanta	Georgia	Includes a small Japanese garden begun in Piedmont Park in the 1960s before the Atlanta Botanical Garden was chartered
Bainbridge Public Library	Bainbridge Island	Washington	Website, Japanese garden on the west side of the library designed in 1998
Bellevue Botanical Garden	Bellevue	Washington	Yao Gardens is a Japanese-style stroll garden
Bellingrath Gardens and Home	Theodore	Alabama	Includes the Asian-American Garden with elements of Japanese and Chinese gardens
Birmingham Botanical Gardens	Birmingham	Alabama	Includes the 7.5 acre Japanese Gardens with a tea garden, the karesansui garden, hill and stream garden, small stroll garden
Bloedel Reserve	Bainbridge Island	Washington	150-acre (0.6 km2) forest garden with a formal Japanese garden and Japanese guesthouse
The Botanic Garden at Oklahoma State University	Stillwater	Oklahoma	Includes a Japanese dry garden or kara san sei, and a Japanese tea garden
Brooklyn Botanic Garden	Brooklyn	New York	Includes the 3-acre Japanese Hill-and-Pond Garden (opened in 1915) and the C. V. Starr Bonsai Museum
Brookside Gardens	Wheaton	Maryland	Includes a Gude Garden and a teahouse
Byodo-In Temple	Kaneohe	Hawaii	Located in Valley of the Temples Memorial Park, non-denominational shrine that is a replica of a 900-year-old Buddhist temple at Uji, landscaped gardens, established in 1968
California Scenario at South Coast Plaza	Costa Mesa	California	1.5 acre sculpture garden designed by Isamu Noguchi, part of the upscale-luxury goods shopping center
Central Washington University Japanese Garden	Ellensburg	Washington	Designed by Masa Mizuno, located next to the Student Union Center
Charles Wood Japanese Garden	Mobile	Alabama	Website, designed by Takeo Uesugi
Cheekwood Botanical Garden and Museum of Art	Nashville	Tennessee	55-acre botanical garden includes the Shomu-en, the pine-mist garden
Chicago Botanic Garden	Glencoe	Illinois	Includes the Elizabeth Hubert Malott Japanese Garden, a 17-acre lakeside garden with three islands, also a collection of nearly 200 bonsai
Cleveland Botanical Garden	Cleveland	Ohio	Includes a Japanese garden designed by David Slawson, was a gift of Ikebana International, Chapter 20, in 1975
Como Park Zoo and Conservatory	Saint Paul	Minnesota	The Marjorie McNeely Conservatory includes the Charlotte Partridge Ordway Japanese Garden and a bonsai collection
Culver City Julian Dixon Library Kaizuka Meditation Garden	Culver City	California	Website
Dawes Arboretum	Newark	Ohio	The Japanese Garden features a meditation house, pond and rock garden and was designed in 1963 by Dr. Makoto Nakamura.
Delaware Park Japanese Garden	Buffalo	New York	Located by the Buffalo History Museum, 6-acre friendship garden with Kanazawa
Denver Botanic Gardens	Denver	Colorado	The Japanese Garden is called Shofu-en—the Garden of Wind and Pines, and was designed by Koichi Kawana in collaboration with Kai Kwahara.
Descanso Gardens	La Cañada Flintridge	California	Includes a Japanese teahouse and a Japanese-style garden designed by Whitney Smith and built in 1966.
Dubuque Arboretum and Botanical Gardens	Dubuque	Iowa	Includes a Japanese garden designed by Hoichi Kurisu, covers 14 acres, including a 4-1/2 acre lake. This is a chisen kaiyu-shiki or “wet strolling garden.”
Duke Farms	Hillsborough	New Jersey	The Japanese section includes a small teahouse, a wood bridge, fuji, azaleas, primrose, crocus, and a karesansui dry garden.
Earl Burns Miller Japanese Garden	Long Beach	California	1.3 acres on the campus of California State University, Long Beach
East–West Center	Honolulu	Hawaii	Features a "Seien" (Serene Garden), a Japanese garden designed by Kenzo Ogata of Tokyo, and located behind Jefferson Hall, and a teahouse
Fabyan Villa	Geneva	Illinois	Features a one-acre garden installed in 1910, designed by Taro Otsuka, includes a pond, waterfall, moon bridge, oversized lantern and teahouse.
Fernwood Botanical Garden and Nature Preserve	Buchanan Township	Michigan	Includes a Japanese "dry" garden designed by Ben Oki (1979), Curator of Bonsai at the Huntington Botanical Gardens
Fort Worth Japanese Garden	Fort Worth	Texas	7.5-acre garden in the Fort Worth Botanic Garden, built in 1973
Four Rivers Cultural Center	Ontario	Oregon	Website, includes a 1.3-acre garden dedicated to as a memorial to Japanese Americans interned during World War II and to the Japanese Americans who for the U.S. in WWII
Franklin Park Conservatory and Botanical Gardens	Columbus	Ohio	Includes a bonsai display
Fuller Gardens	North Hampton	New Hampshire	Summer estate of Alvan T. Fuller, includes a Japanese garden with koi pond
Furman University Asian Garden	Greenville	South Carolina	Almost 2 acres, Japanese and Asian elements, includes a Hei-Sei-Ji temple that was originally standing in Nagoya
Ganna Walska Lotusland	Montecito	California	The Japanese Garden includes a Shinto shrine and koi pond.
Garden of Serenity	Bethlehem	Pennsylvania	Outside the Bethlehem Area Public Library, designed by Yoshinaga Sakon in 1971, gift from the twin city of Tondabayashi, includes raked sands, bonsai and topiary bushes, and a tea house.
Garden of the Phoenix at Jackson Park	Chicago	Illinois	A peace garden originally built in 1893 for the World's Columbian Exposition
Gardena Mayme Dear Library Japanese Garden	Gardena	California	Website, opened in 1964, designed by Takuma Tono
Gardens of the World	Thousand Oaks	California	Website, the Japanese garden features an authentic Japanese Pagoda and koi pond
Garvan Woodland Gardens	Hot Springs	Arkansas	Features the 4-acre Garden of the Pine Wind, designed by David Slawson, includes 300 varieties of Asian ornamental plants, a 'Full Moon Bridge', three cascades, a 12-foot waterfall, two springs, four pools and a pond.
George and Sakaye Aratani Japanese Garden at Cal Poly Pomona	Pomona	California	Website, 1.3 acres (0.53 ha) Japanese garden built in 2003 and designed by Takeo Uesugi, adjacent to the CLA Building and the W.K. Kellogg Commemorative Rose Garden
Hakone Gardens	Saratoga	California	18-acre Japanese estate, retreat and gardens, includes a bamboo garden, Zen garden, strolling garden, tea houses, and the Cultural Exchange Center, which is an authentic reproduction of a 19th-century Kyoto tea merchant's house and shop.
Hammond Museum and Japanese Stroll Garden	North Salem	New York	About 7 acres, exhibits of Eastern and Western art and programs
Hannah Carter Japanese Garden	Los Angeles	California	Currently not open to the public, completed in 1961, emphasizes water, stones, and evergreen plants.
Haverford College Arboretum	Haverford	Pennsylvania	Includes the Denis Asian Garden and Teaf Memorial Zen-style Garden adjoining the Dining Center
Hayward Japanese Gardens	Hayward	California	Designed by Kimio Kimura, over 3 acres, includes a koi pond, teahouse and viewing pavilions set along a ravine
Heathcote Botanical Gardens	Fort Pierce	Florida	Features the James J. Smith Bonsai Gallery with 100 bonsai trees, and a Japanese garden designed by Mollie Crimmins in the 1960s
Hermann Park	Houston	Texas	The Japanese Garden was designed by Ken Nakajima in 1992, includes a teahouse, waterfalls, bridges, and stone paths that wander among crepe myrtles, azaleas, Japanese maples, dogwoods and cherry trees.
Hershey Gardens	Hershey	Pennsylvania	Includes a Japanese garden with rare giant sequoias, Dawn Redwood trees, Japanese maples and more.
Hillwood Estate, Museum & Gardens	Washington D.C.	D.C.	Includes a Japanese garden designed by landscape architect Shogo Myaida, features a stream and pond, combines native and Japanese plants including Japanese pines, Colorado blue spruce, maples, azaleas, and false cypress.
Huntington Library Botanical Garden	San Marino	California	The Japanese Garden features a moon bridge, a large bell, the authentic ceremonial teahouse Seifu-an (the Arbor of Pure Breeze), a fully furnished Japanese house, koi-filled ponds, the Zen Garden, and the bonsai collections with hundreds of trees.
Ichimura Miami Japanese Garden	Miami	Florida	Website, located on Watson Island
Innisfree Garden	Millbrook	New York	150-acre garden, merges the essence of Modernist and Romantic ideas with traditional Chinese and Japanese garden design
International Peace Gardens	Salt Lake City	Utah	Includes a Japanese garden
Ippakutei Tea House, Embassy of Japan	Washington D.C.	D.C.	Website, authentic Japanese tea house and replica of the rock garden at Ryōan-ji, open for events by the Japan Information & Culture Center
Japanese Friendship Garden	San Diego	California	12 acres, located in Balboa Park, landscape designed by Takeo Uesugi, includes a bonsai collection and teahouse
Japanese Friendship Garden	San Jose	California	5.5 acres, located in Kelley Park, includes three koi ponds, patterned after Japan's famous Korakuen Garden in Okayama
Japanese Garden	Lodi	California	3 acres, located in Micke Grove Regional Park, designed by Nagao Sakurai
The Japanese Garden	Los Angeles	California	Located in Van Nuys, 6.5 acres (2.6 ha) public Japanese garden located on the grounds of the Tillman Water Reclamation Plant in the Sepulveda Basin Recreation Area of the central San Fernando Valley, designed by Dr. Koichi Kawana and created from 1980 to 1983
The Japanese Garden at the Stillwater Community Center	Stillwater	Oklahoma	Opened in 1997 as a showcase of the relationship between Stillwater and Kameoka as sister cities
Japanese Tea Garden at Central Park	San Mateo	California	Website, designed by Nagao Sakurai, features a granite pagoda, tea house, koi pond and bamboo grove
Japanese Tea Garden	San Francisco	California	3 acres, located in Golden Gate Park, oldest public Japanese garden in the United States, designed by Makoto Hagiwara, includes ponds, a pagoda, moon bridge and a teahouse
Japanese-American Cultural and Community Center	Los Angeles	California	Website, includes the James Irvine Japanese Garden, also known as Seiryu-en or "Garden of the Clear Stream", designed by Takeo Uesugi & Associates
JC Raulston Arboretum	Raleigh	North Carolina	Administered by North Carolina State University, includes a Zen garden of raked gravel and hand-crafted wooden and stone features
Jo Ryo En Japanese Garden at Carleton College	Northfield	Minnesota	Located behind Watson Hall, opened in 1976
John P. Humes Japanese Stroll Garden	Mill Neck	New York	4 acres, includes a tea house in the shoin-dzukuri style of the Ashikaga period, tea garden, stone lanterns, mosses, waterfall, pond; may be closed
Kubota Garden	Seattle	Washington	20 acres with 4.5-acre landscaped core, started in 1927 by Fujitaro Kubota
Kyoto Gardens of Honolulu Memorial Park	Honolulu	Hawaii	Cemetery with three-tiered Sanju Pagoda, Kinkaku-ji Temple, and Mirror Gardens
Kyoto Garden at Oklahoma Science Museum	Oklahoma City	Oklahoma	Gifted to the State of Oklahoma in 1984 as a symbol of friendship between Kyoto and Oklahoma. It was restored in 2022 by the Japan America Society of Oklahoma with the help of Kyoto Master Gardeners
Lakeside Park	Oakland	California	Website, includes a Japanese garden, bonsai garden and Torii gate garden at the Gardens at Lake Merritt
Lauritzen Gardens	Omaha	Nebraska	Planned Japanese garden
Lendonwood Gardens	Grove	Oklahoma	Includes the Japanese Pavilion Garden with a koi pond
Lewis Ginter Botanical Garden	Richmond	Virginia	Includes the Asian Valley
Liliuokalani Park and Gardens	Hilo	Hawaii	30 acres, Edo-style Japanese gardens with bridges, koi ponds, pagodas, statues, torii, and a Japanese teahouse
Lithia Park	Ashland	Oregon	Includes a Japanese garden
Manito Park and Botanical Gardens	Spokane	Washington	Includes the Nishinomiya Tsutakawa Japanese Garden designed in 1967 by Nagao Sakurai
Massee Lane Gardens	Fort Valley	Georgia	Includes the Abendroth Japanese Garden with a tea house and koi
Maymont Japanese Garden	Richmond	Virginia	Features a koi pond, large waterfall, torii gate, rock gardens
Memphis Botanic Garden	Memphis	Tennessee	Includes the Japanese Garden of Tranquility (1965, 1989), designed by Dr. P. T. Tono, Tokyo; redesigned by Dr. Koichi Kawana
Miami Beach Botanical Garden	Miami Beach	Florida	Includes a Japanese garden
Micke Grove Regional Park Japanese Garden	Lodi	California	Website, designed by Nagao Sakurai and dedicated in 1965
Minnesota Landscape Arboretum	Chaska	Minnesota	“Seisui Tei” or Garden of Pure Water reflects a style of Japanese Garden from the Edo Period, designed by Koichi Kawana in 1985, maintained under the direction of Dr. David Slawson
Morikami Museum and Japanese Gardens	Delray Beach	Florida	Includes two museum buildings, the Roji-en Japanese Gardens: Garden of the Drops of Dew and a bonsai garden
Muscatine Art Center Japanese Garden	Muscatine	Iowa	Small Japanese-style garden built around 1930 for Laura Musser McColm of Muscatine
Mytoi	Chappaquiddick Island	Massachusetts	Operated by The Trustees of Reservations on Martha's Vineyard
National Museum of the Pacific War	Fredericksburg	Texas	Includes the Japanese Garden of Peace, established in 1976
New Orleans Botanical Garden	New Orleans	Louisiana	Includes the Yakumo Nihon Teien Japanese Garden
New York Botanical Garden	Bronx	New York	Includes a 2.5-acre Japanese rock garden
Norfolk Botanical Garden	Norfolk	Virginia	The Japanese Garden (1962) was created to honor Norfolk's sister city, Moji, Japan, and rededicated in 1962 to Kitakyushu, formerly Moji; redesigned and refurbished in 1995.
Normandale Community College Japanese Garden	Bloomington	Minnesota	2 acres
Phipps Conservatory and Botanical Gardens	Pittsburgh	Pennsylvania	Includes the Japanese Courtyard Garden (1991) with bonsai, designed by Hoichi Kurisu
Pine Bluff Japanese Garden	Pine Bluff	Arkansas	Located at the Pine Bluff Civic Center, was a gift from Pine Bluff's Sister City, Iwai City, Japan
Point Defiance Park	Tacoma	Washington	The Japanese garden features a pagoda built in 1914 as a streetcar station
Portland Japanese Garden	Portland	Oregon	5.5 acres, features the Strolling Pond Garden, Natural Garden, Sand and Stone Garden, Flat Garden and Tea Garden
Ro Ho En - Japanese Friendship Garden of Phoenix	Phoenix	Arizona	3.5 acre Japanese stroll garden with a tea garden and tea house
Rotary Botanical Gardens	Janesville	Wisconsin	Built in 1989, the Japanese garden includes gates, fences, a dry gravel sea, stones, a waterfall, stream, Japanese lanterns and other elements.
San Antonio Botanical Garden	San Antonio	Texas	Includes Kumamoto En Japanese Garden, built in 1989, patterned after the Suizenji Park in Kumamoto
San Antonio Japanese Tea Garden	San Antonio	Texas	11 acres, located in Brackenridge Park, includes shaded walkways, stone bridges, a 60-foot waterfall and ponds filled with koi
San Francisco Botanical Garden	San Francisco	California	Includes a Japanese-design moon-viewing garden
San Jose Buddhist Church Betsuin	San Jose	California	Website, located in Japantown, temple's garden includes a pagoda, a small bridge and topiary plants
San Jose Japanese Friendship Garden	San Jose	California	Website, located in Kelley Park, temple's garden design was donated to San Jose from city of Okayama using Korakuen as an inspiration and built by volunteers from the Japanese American community in 1957–1960. The 6 acre garden includes a very large koi pond, Teahouse available for rent, many old pagodas, reflection lantern, zig-zag bridge, cherry blossom tree section, waterfall, curved walkways, a moon bridge, many bridges, artistic rocks and topiaried plants
Santa Barbara Botanic Garden	Santa Barbara	California	Includes an authentic Japanese teahouse and demonstration garden
Satsuki Gardens	Grove	Oklahoma	Designed by Dr. Leonard Miller
Seattle Japanese Garden	Seattle	Washington	3.5 acres, designed by Kiyoshi Inoshita and Juki Iida, completed in 1959
Seiwa-en at Missouri Botanical Garden	St. Louis	Missouri	14-acre Japanese strolling garden, designed by Dr. Koichi Kawana
Sherman Library and Gardens	Newport Beach	California	Includes a Japanese garden
Shinwa-En Japanese Garden at CSU Dominguez Hills	Carson	California	Designed in 1978 by Haruo Yamashiro, includes a tea house, located in the courtyard of the Social and Behavioral Sciences building
Shinzen Japanese Garden	Fresno	California	Located in Woodward Park, 5-acre Japanese stroll garden opened in 1981 and designed by Paul Saito, includes a teahouse
Shiojiri Niwa	Mishawaka	Indiana	Website, 1.3-acre Japanese strolling garden in Merrifield Park
Shofuso Japanese House and Garden	Philadelphia	Pennsylvania	17th century-style Japanese house and 1.2-acre garden
Shore Acres State Park	Coos Bay	Oregon	Includes a Japanese-style garden built around a 100-foot lily pond
Shoto-Teien Japanese Gardens	Sioux Falls	South Dakota	Website part of Terrace Park
Sister City Park	Shawnee	Oklahoma	
Sister Mary Grace Burns Arboretum	Lakewood Township	New Jersey	Part of Georgian Court University, the Japanese Garden was designed by Takeo Shiota
Smith College Botanic Garden and Lyman Plant House	Northampton	Massachusetts	Website, includes a Japanese garden
Sonnenberg Gardens	Canandaigua	New York	The Japanese garden features miniature mountainous Japanese landscape, with torii gates and a tea house.
Springfield Botanical Gardens at Nathanael Greene/Close Memorial Park	Springfield	Missouri	Website, includes the 7.5-acre Mizumoto Japanese Stroll Garden with a koi lake, moon bridge, meditation garden, and tea house
Stan Hywet Hall and Gardens	Akron	Ohio	Includes a Japanese garden designed in 1916 by T.R. Otsuka and Warren Manning
Stanley Park	Westfield	Massachusetts	Includes an Asian garden and Japanese tea house
Storrier-Stearns Japanese Garden	Pasadena	California	1.45-acre (0.59 ha) hill and pond strolling garden, the "chisen kaiyu shiki" form
Swiss Pines	Malvern	Pennsylvania	Currently closed.
Tenshin-en at Museum of Fine Arts	Boston	Massachusetts	Contemplative indoor Japanese garden
Japanese Cultural Center, Tea House, and Gardens of Saginaw	Saginaw	Michigan	Website, 3 acres
Torrance Cultural Arts Center	Torrance	California	Website, includes the Pine Wind Garden (Sho Fu En)
United States National Arboretum	Washington D.C.	D.C.	Includes the National Bonsai & Penjing Museum
University of California Botanical Garden	Berkeley	California	The Asian Collection area includes a Japanese Pool with traditional garden items
University of Illinois Arboretum	Urbana	Illinois	Includes a Japanese arts teaching facility, Japan House, with tea garden (2002), dry or Zen garden (2003). The gardens are free, and open dawn to dusk, but the walled tea garden is closed during icy weather.
Wa-Shin-An Japanese Tea House and Meditation Garden	South Hadley	Massachusetts	Website, located on the top floor of Eliot House at Mount Holyoke College
Wells Japanese Garden	Newberry	South Carolina	Features a temple, torri gate, moon bridge and tea house
Wesleyan University Japanese Garden	Middletown	Connecticut	Website, Shôyôan Garden at the Freeman Center for East Asian Studies
Yashiro Japanese Garden	Olympia	Washington	0.74 acres
Yuko-En on the Elkhorn	Georgetown	Kentucky	6 acres, strolling garden
Yushien at Amherst College	Amherst	Massachusetts	Website, a contemplative garden in the Japanese style located between Webster Hall and Kirby Theater, designed by Shinichiro Abe of Zen Associates
Zilker Botanical Garden	Austin	Texas	Includes the 3-acre Isamu Taniguchi Japanese Garden
