= Noritaka Tatehana =

Japanese shoe designer

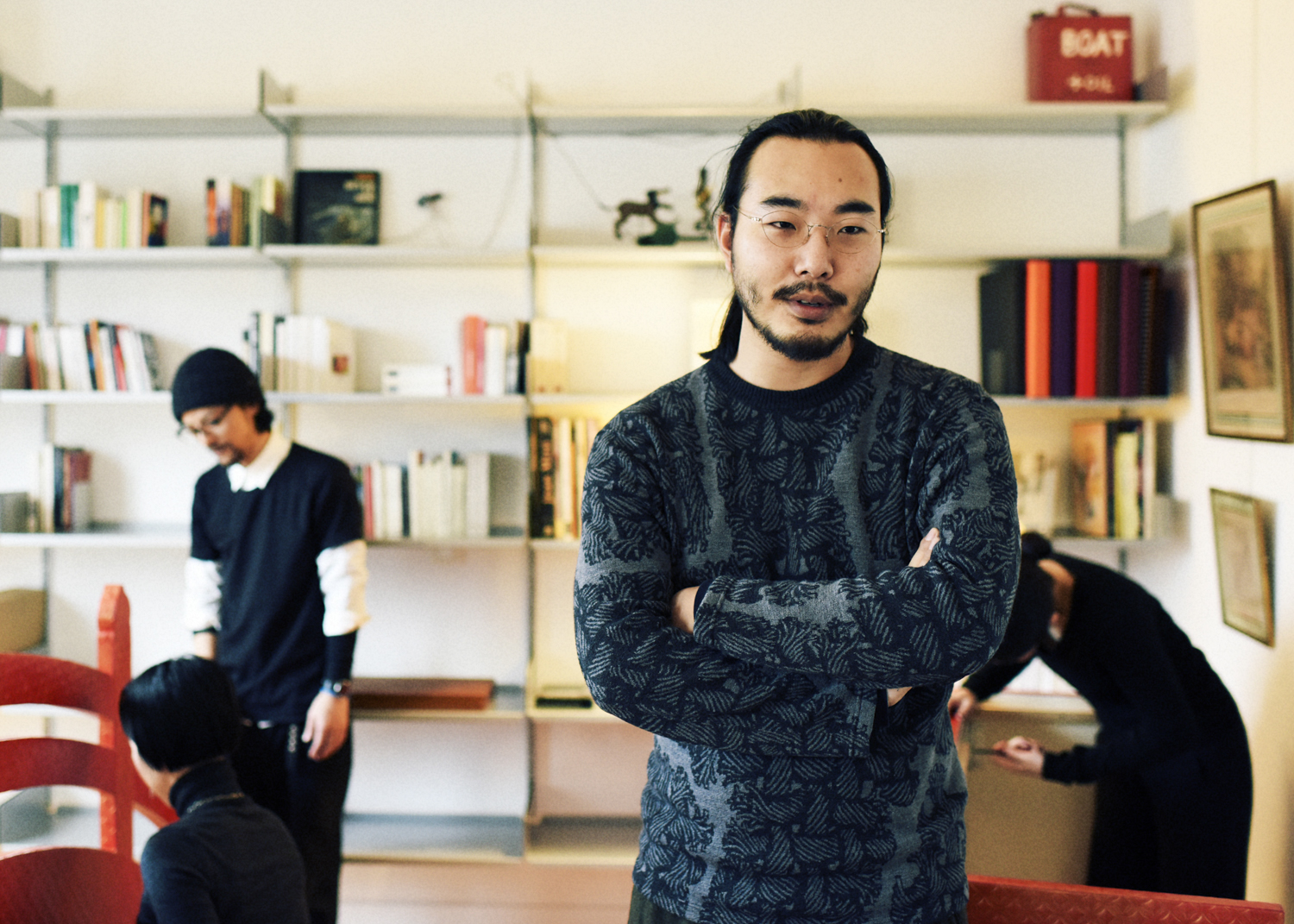
Noritaka Tatehana (at right), 2016

Noritaka Tatehana (born 1985 in Tokyo, Japan) is a Japanese shoe designer born into a family that ran a public bathhouse. He studied fine arts, Japanese craft, dyeing, and weaving at the Tokyo University of the Arts.

Tatehana has created clothing, including kimono and shoes, and many of his designs are held in the public collections of museums such as the Metropolitan Museum of Art in New York, and the Victoria and Albert Museum in London.

Tatehana handcrafts each step of the manufacturing process of his shoes, all of which are collection pieces. His futuristic shoes, which re-think the notion of "high heels", are unique in both decoration and style, as they are often heel-less platform shoes. His shoes come in a wide variety of colours and patterns, from black to silver, and from fiery red to gold.

Tatehana's shoes were included in the V&A Shoes: Pleasure and Pain exhibition in 2015–16. In October and November 2019, the Portland Japanese Garden is showing Tatehana's shoes and other work in his first US exhibition.
