= Hoichi Kurisu =

Japanese landscape architect (born 1939)

Hoichi Kurisu (栗栖宝一, Kurisu Hōichi) is a Japanese-American landscape architect who designs Japanese gardens in the United States.

== Biography ==
Kurisu was born in 1939. He was six years old and living in Sunami (now part of Mihara), a village outside of Hiroshima, when the U.S. dropped an atomic bomb on Hiroshima. According to Kurisu, he and his family were protected from the blast by a mountain that stood between their home and the bombing site.

In 1963, he traveled to California, taking up landscaping work in Los Angeles with his father and stepbrothers. He returned to Japan in 1964 to study landscape design and construction under Kenzo Ogata at Waseda University.

He then was Landscape director for the Garden Society of Japan (Nihon Teien Kyokai) (1968–1972), during which time he supervised construction of the Portland Japanese Garden. In 1972, he founded Kurisu International, Inc., and began designing, building, and maintaining gardens, primarily for residential clients in Portland, Oregon. The firm expanded to have a nursery and 80 employees by the mid-1990s.

Kurisu designed the Roji-en Japanese Gardens at the Morikami Museum and Japanese Gardens, a set of six gardens representing 1,000 years of Japanese horticultural tradition from the 9th to the 20th centuries. They were completed in 2001. Kurisu designed gardens at the Samaritan Lebanon Community Hospital, in Lebanon, Oregon, which was the winner of a 2006 "Healthcare Environment Award for Landscape Design".

Kurisu is married to Judy Kurisu and the two have a daughter, Michiko, who has worked with him at the Kurisu LLC design and construction firm since 1999.

== Awards and commendations ==
Kurisu has received two U.S. National Landscape Awards. In 2025, he received a commendation from Shigeo Yamada, ambassador of Japan to the United States.

== Selected works ==
- Anderson Japanese Gardens – Rockford, Illinois
- Asian Rock Garden at the Samuel P. Harn Museum of Art – Gainesville, Florida
- Dubuque Arboretum and Botanical Gardens – Dubuque, Iowa
- Portland Japanese Garden – Portland, Oregon
- Roji-en Japanese Gardens at the Morikami Museum and Japanese Gardens – Delray Beach, Florida
- The Richard & Helen DeVos Japanese Garden at Frederik Meijer Gardens & Sculpture Park – Grand Rapids, Michigan
- Japanese Garden at the Oregon State Penitentiary – Salem, Oregon
- Healing Garden at Rosecrance – Rockford, Illinois
- Talking Water Gardens – Albany, Oregon

== See also ==
- Takuma Tono
