= Takuma Tono =

Japanese-born landscape designer (1891–1987)

- 戸野琢磨
- Born: 1891; Osaka, Japan
- Died: 1987 (aged 95–96)
- Education: Hokkaido University; Cornell University; Tokyo Agricultural University
- Occupation: Landscape architect
- Notable work: Portland Japanese Garden

Paul Takuma Tono (Japanese: 戸野琢磨; 1891–1987) was a landscape architect, professor, and writer who designed Japanese gardens in Japan and the United States.

== Biography ==
Tono was born in Osaka, Japan in 1891. He attended Hokkaido University, graduating in 1916. He then attended Cornell University to earn his master's degree. During his studies, he assisted in the annual chrysantheum show at Elmwood Music Hall, and the development of the Delaware Park Japanese Garden in Buffalo, New York. He graduated with his master's degree in 1921.

In 1923, Tono returned to Japan. He began teaching at Tokyo Agricultural University and became head of the landscape architecture department there.

After World War II, Tono returned to the U.S. In 1961, he was the chief consultant for a U.S.-based replica of the sand and stone garden at the Ryōan-ji temple in Kyoto, serving as a liaison to source the stones used for the temple and also designing the raked gravel garden that surrounded the replica in the Brooklyn Botanic Garden. In 1962, Tono began to design and develop the Portland Japanese Garden, travelling between Tokyo and Portland from 1961 to the garden's opening in 1967. In the 1960s, he also designed the Japanese garden at the Memphis Botanic Garden in Tennessee, as well as a smaller garden at the Gardena Mayme Dear Library in Gardena, California.

Tono died in 1987 at the age of 96.

== Writing ==
Tono wrote several books on landscape architecture. These books included Gardens in Europe: Landscape Architecture (1928), A Secret of Japanese Gardens (1958), Japanese Gardens for California (1969), and Landscape Planning and Design (1970).

== See also ==
- List of landscape architects
- Alden B. Dow
- Koichi Kawana
- Hoichi Kurisu
- Ken Nakajima
- Nagao Sakurai
- Mirei Shigemori
- Takeo Uesugi
