= Anderson Japanese Gardens =

Botanical garden located in Rockford, Illinois

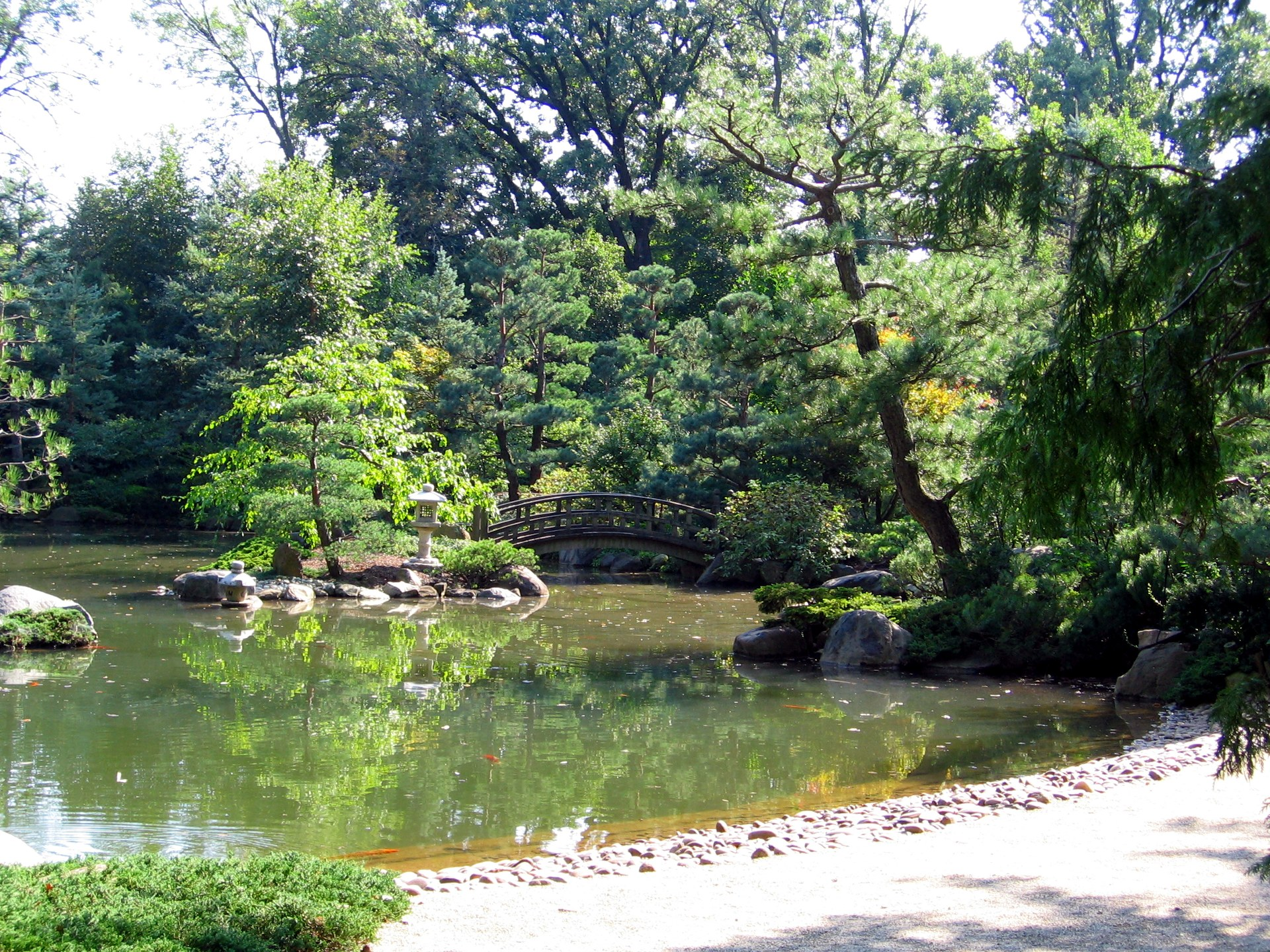
- Interactive map of Anderson Japanese Gardens
- Coordinates: 42.29005390°N 89.05779540°W
- Area: 12 acres (4.9 ha)
- Established: 1978
- Founder: John Anderson
- Operator: 501(c)(3) organization
- Website: andersongardens.org

The Anderson Japanese Gardens is a 12-acre (4.9 ha) Japanese garden located in Rockford, Illinois.

== History ==
The gardens were established in 1978 by John R. Anderson and landscape architect Hoichi Kurisu on the site of Anderson's home. They were inspired by Anderson's trips to Japan, and particularly his visit to the Portland Japanese Garden in Washington Park, Portland, Oregon, which were also designed by Kurisu.

In 1992, John Anderson was recognized for his outstanding work in promoting international friendship and mutual understanding between the United States and Japan with a commemorative silver cup from the Japanese government. Educational programs at the Anderson Gardens cover the language, arts, and culture of Japan, and the Gardens host formal tea ceremonies, ikebana and calligraphy demonstrations, bonsai displays, and feature programs for students and adults. Anderson Japanese Gardens hosts an annual Opening Day Celebration and Japanese Summer Festival, featuring celebrations of Japanese culture. In 1998, Mr. and Mrs. Anderson donated the gardens to a nonprofit organization.

In 2004, the gardens were named finest Japanese garden in North America by the Journal of Japanese Gardening. In 2011, Tuesday Evening in the Gardens kicked off featuring singer/songwriters and local food vendors.

== Features ==
The gardens are in a 13th-century "pond strolling" garden with several waterfalls and ponds, streams, rock formations, winding paths, and a sukiya style tea house and guest house (built by Masahiro Hamada). The "Garden of Reflection" is a contemporary Japanese-inspired garden, with bronze angel sculptures by Carl Milles. Plantings include Japanese maples, cloud pines, azaleas, magnolias, and rhododendrons.

The gardens are home to many species of colorful fish, minks, and ducks. In the "Garden of Reflection" beetle traps hang over the water to encourage these fish to surface for food. Professional photography is only permitted after hours with management approval, but amateur photography is encouraged. There are also many forbidden paths that lead up to the Anderson home.

== Gallery ==
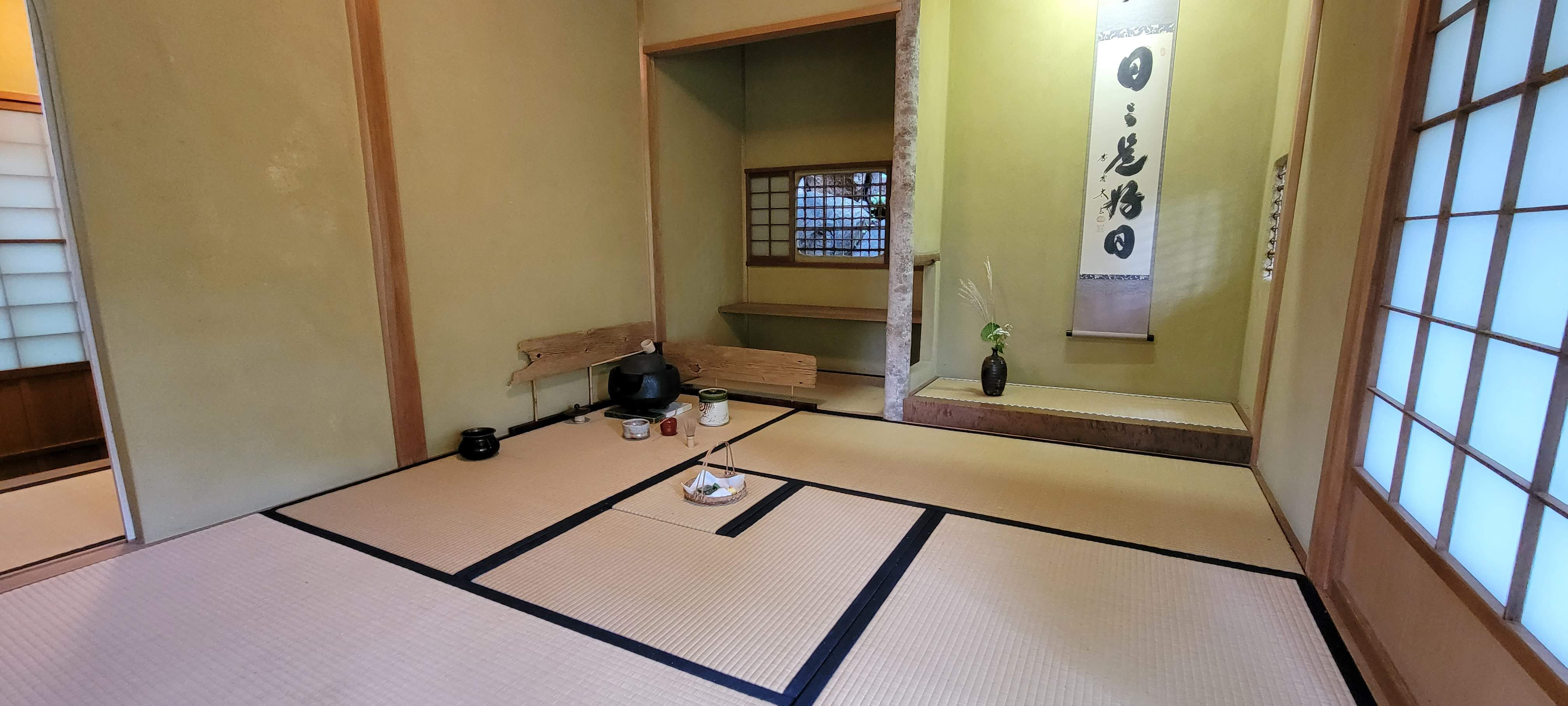
The tea house, where tea ceremonies are held

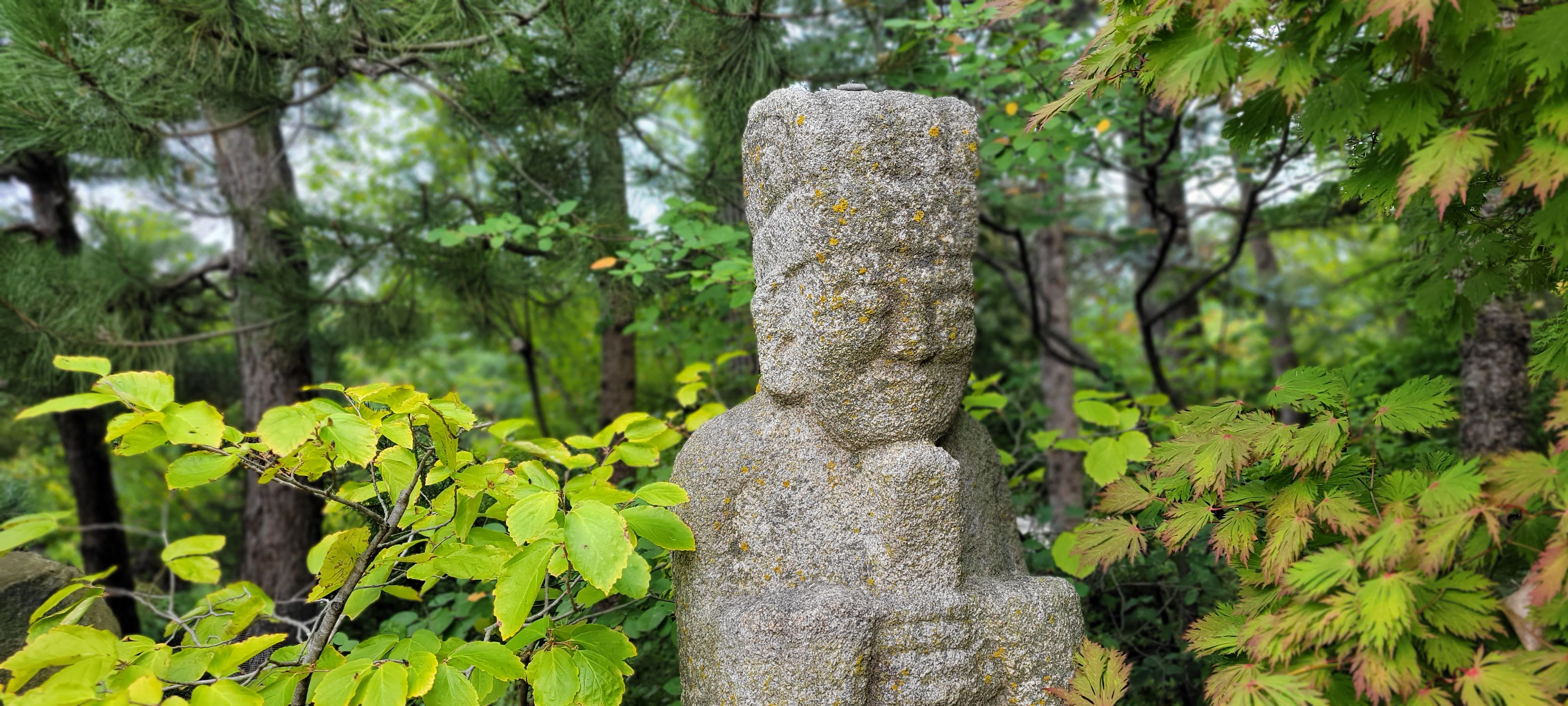
One of the many statues hidden within the plants

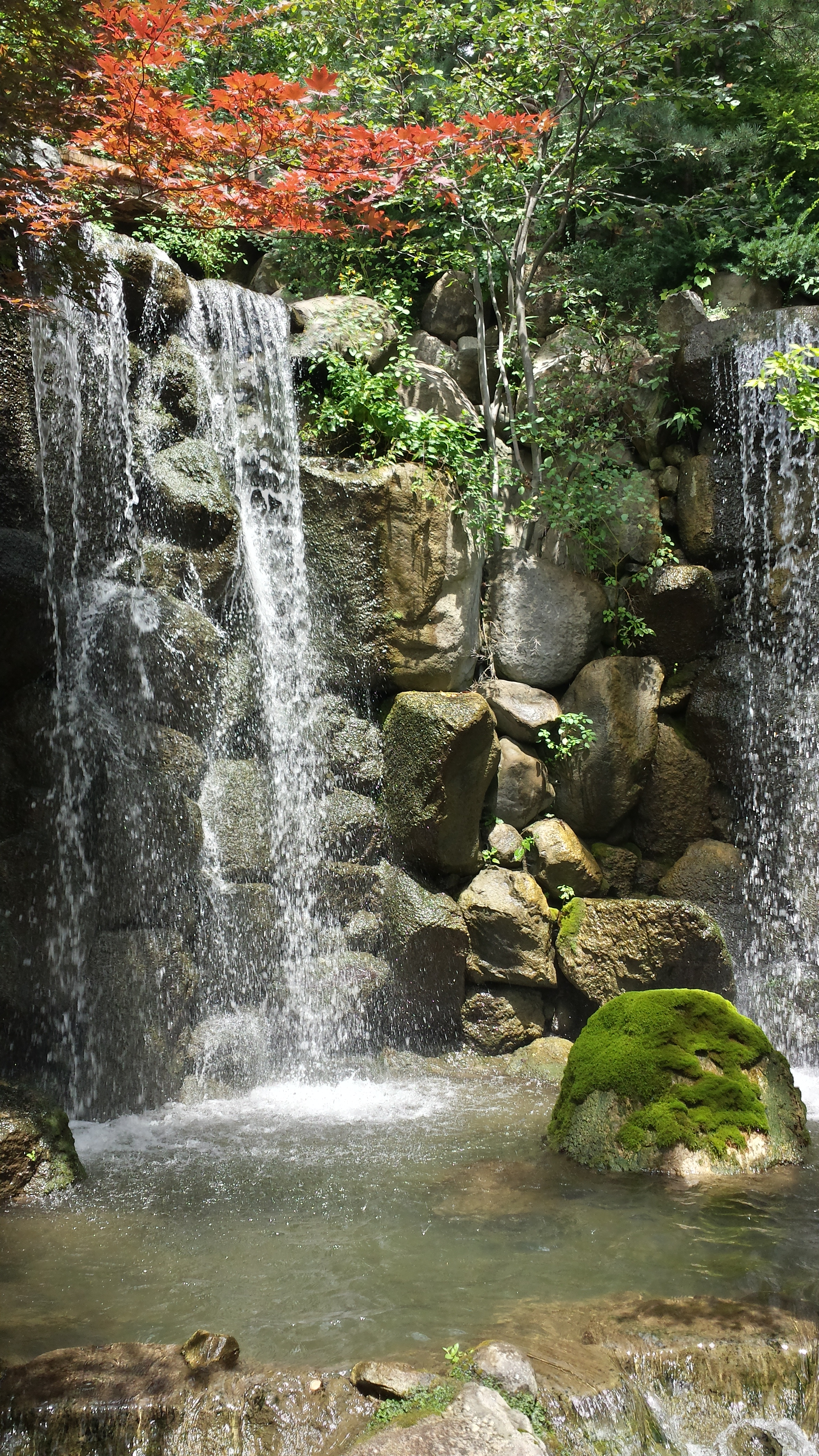
Waterfall at Anderson Japanese Gardens

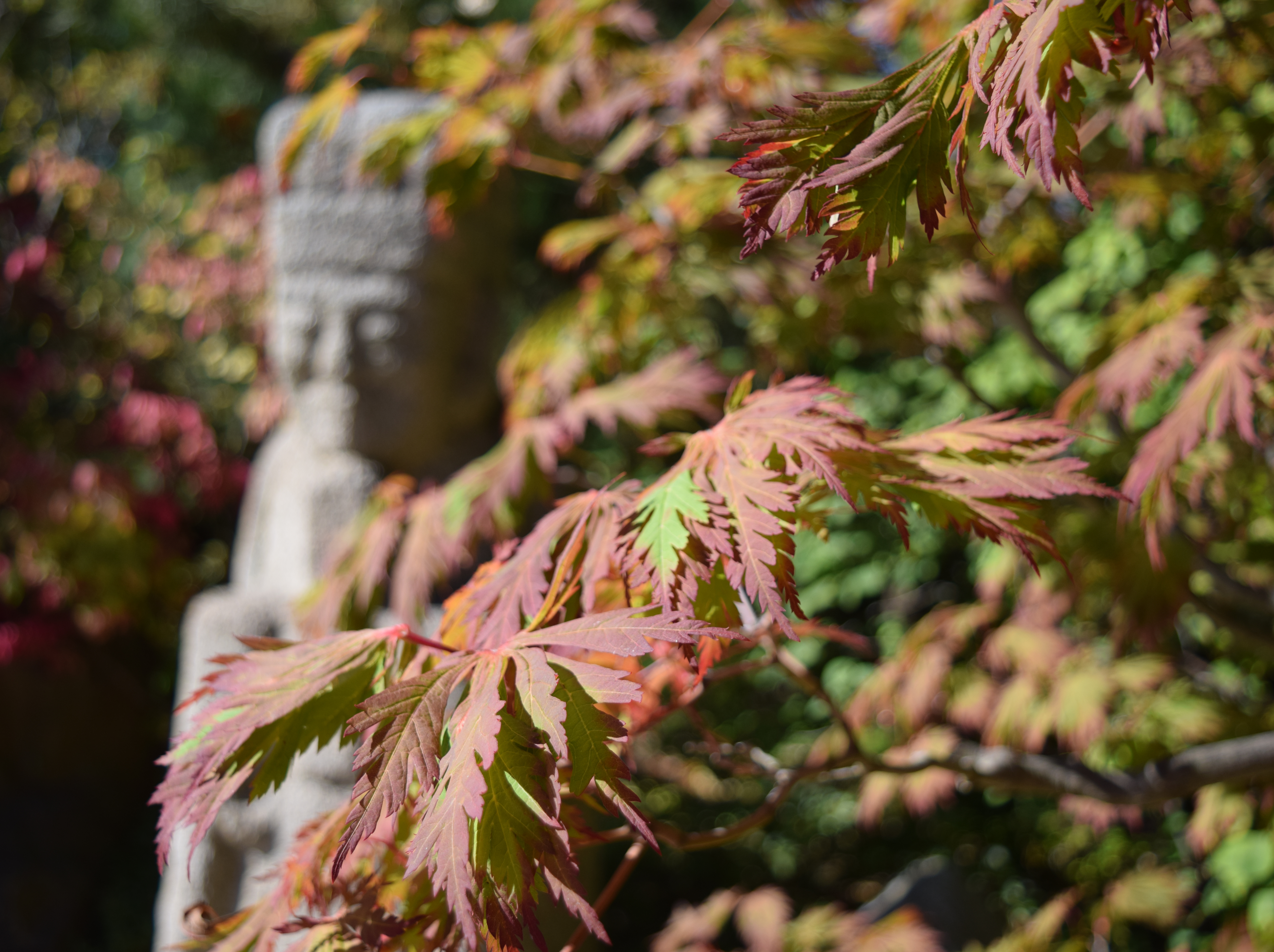
Japanese Maple Leaves with statue in background taken at Anderson Japanese Gardens in October 2015

== See also ==
- List of botanical gardens and arboretums in the United States
