= Wells Japanese Garden =

- U.S. National Register of Historic Places
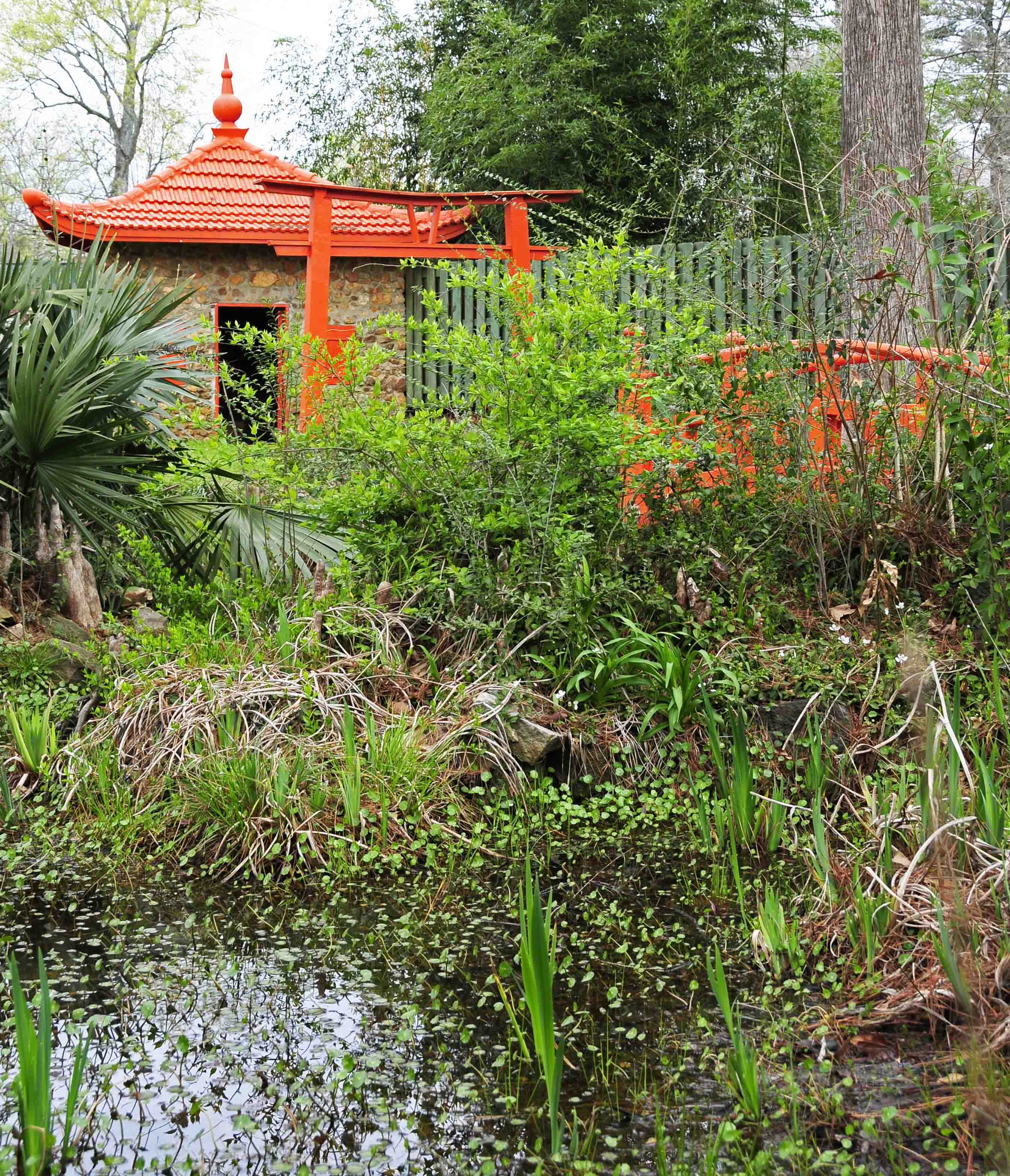

- Location within South Carolina Location within the United States
- Location: 1608 Lindsay St., Newberry, South Carolina
- Coordinates: 34°16′42″N 81°37′11″W
- Area: 0.5 acres (0.20 ha)
- Built: 1930
- Architect: Wells, W. Fulmer
- MPS: Newberry MRA
- NRHP reference No.: 80003689
- Added to NRHP: November 26, 1980

Wells Japanese Garden is a small Japanese garden located at 1608 Lindsay Street in Newberry, South Carolina. It is open daily.

It was listed on the National Register of Historic Places in 1980.

The garden was created by W. Fulmer Wells in 1930, donated to the city in 1971, and added to the National Register of Historic Places in 1980. It is currently being restored and maintained by the Newberry Council of Garden Clubs.

The garden contains two ponds, concrete bridges in a Japanese style, torii, a teahouse, and a variety of indigenous and exotic flora including lotus, Japanese iris, water lilies, crepe myrtle, dogwood, and cypress.

On February 12, 2012, at 12:12 the City of Newberry met with Senior Curator of The Presidential Service Museum, Martin CJ Mongiello, to accept a gift of a Matsu (pine) tree. Mongiello lived in Japan for many years and remembered visiting Tokyo's famed Zōjō-ji Temple, where Presidents George H. W. Bush and Ulysses S. Grant each planted a pine tree. City officials at the meeting were Matt DeWitt and Jeff Shacker. Doctor Jerry Livingston, a local resident and former missionary in Japan of 40 years visited at 2:12 on the 12th to be introduced to the garden for the first time.

Komatsu Corporation donated a sizeable fund to help with additions at the garden in 2012. Both Doctor Livingston and Mongiello pledged to assist in the garden for 2012.

== See also ==
- List of botanical gardens in the United States
