= Portland Japanese Garden =

Japanese garden in Portland, Oregon, U.S.

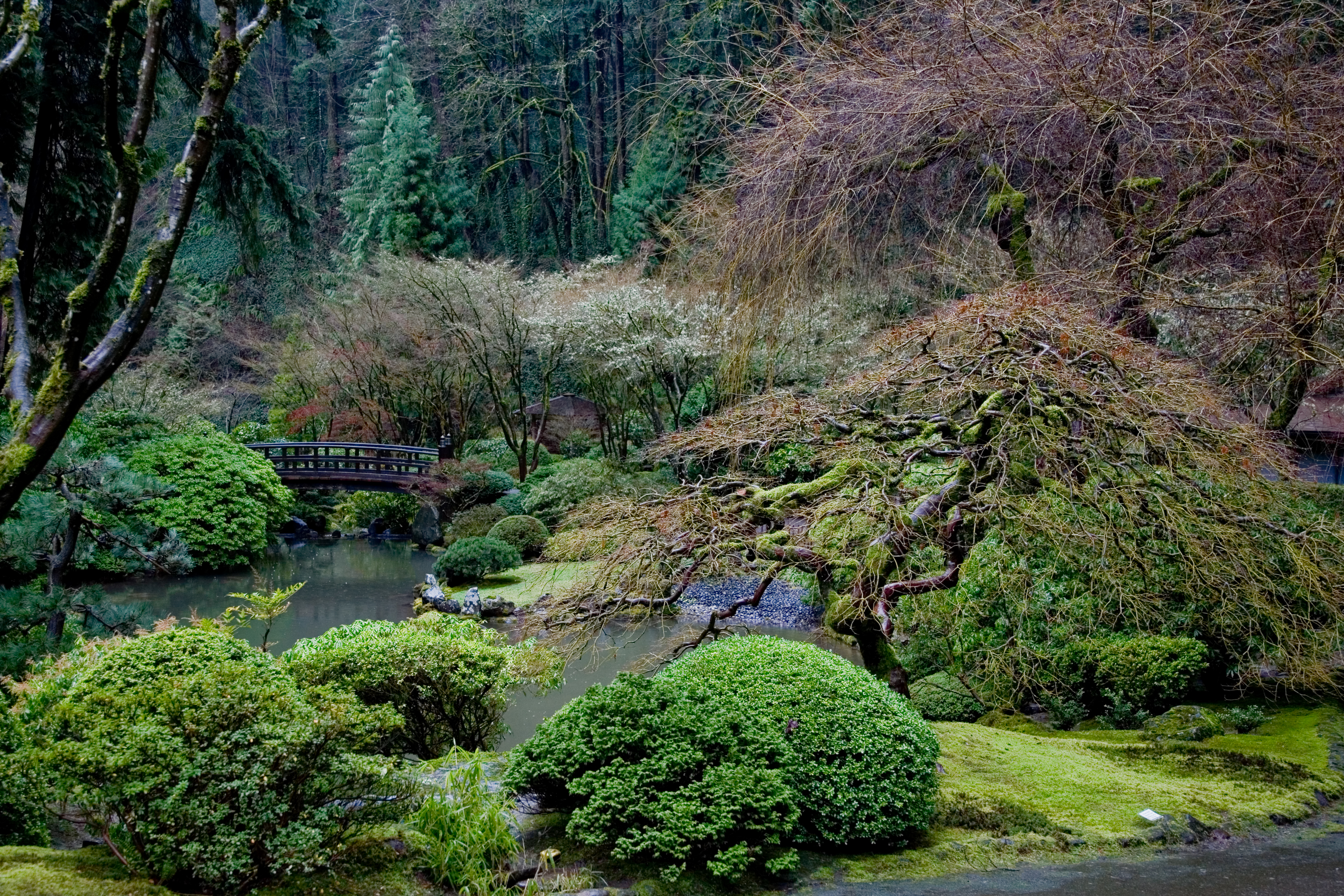

- Location within Portland, Oregon Location within Oregon Location within the United States
- Type: Japanese garden
- Location: Portland, Oregon, United States
- Coordinates: 45.51872°N 122.7080°W
- Area: 12.5 acres (5.1 ha)
- Opened: 1967
- Visitors: 400,000 (in 2024)
- Status: Open to the public
- Collections: Strolling Pond Garden; Natural Garden; Sand and Stone Garden; Flat Garden; Tea Garden; Entry Garden; Bonsai Terrace; Tsubo-Niwa
- Public transit: 63
- Website: www.japanesegarden.com

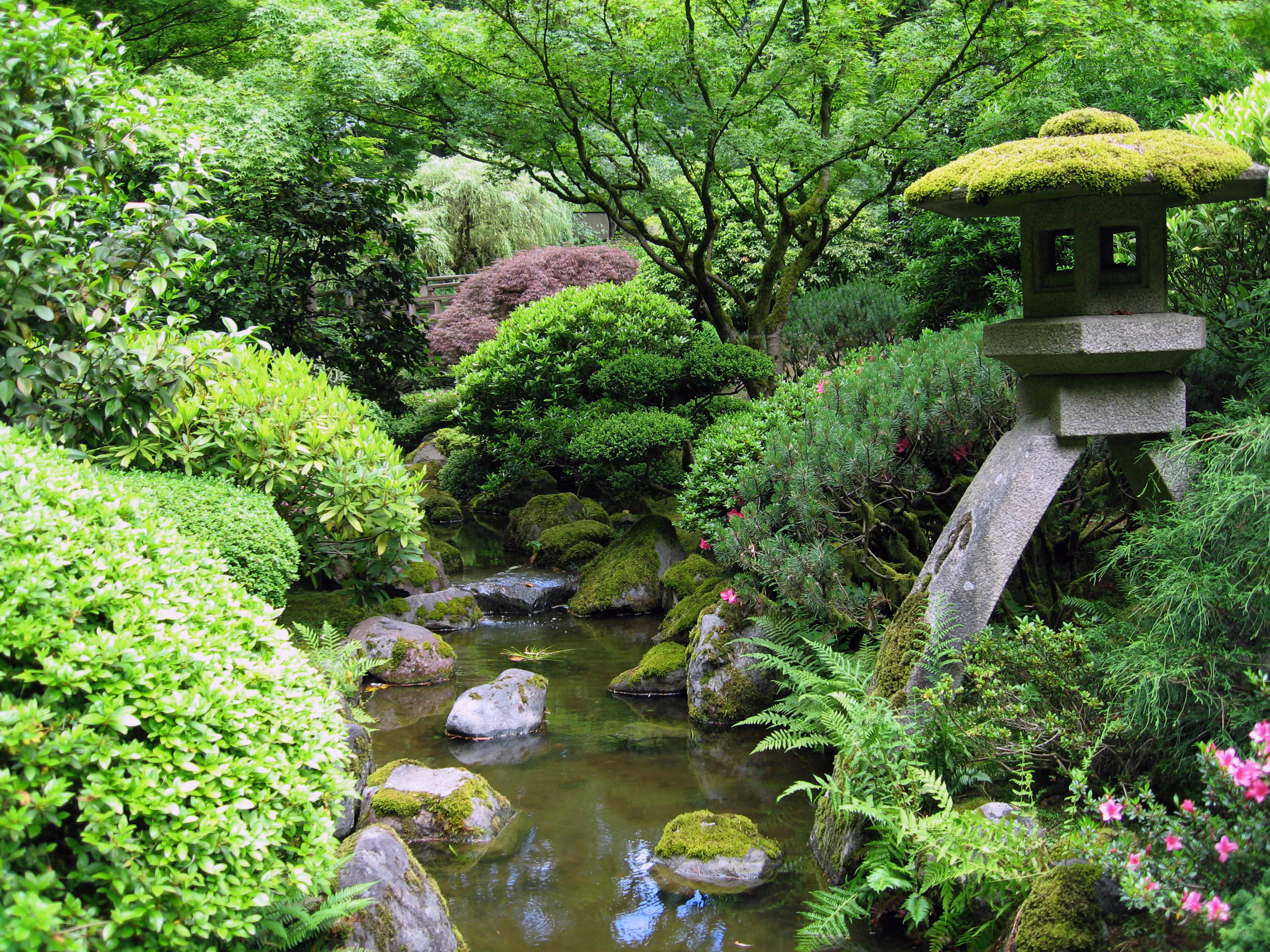
Koto-ji lantern

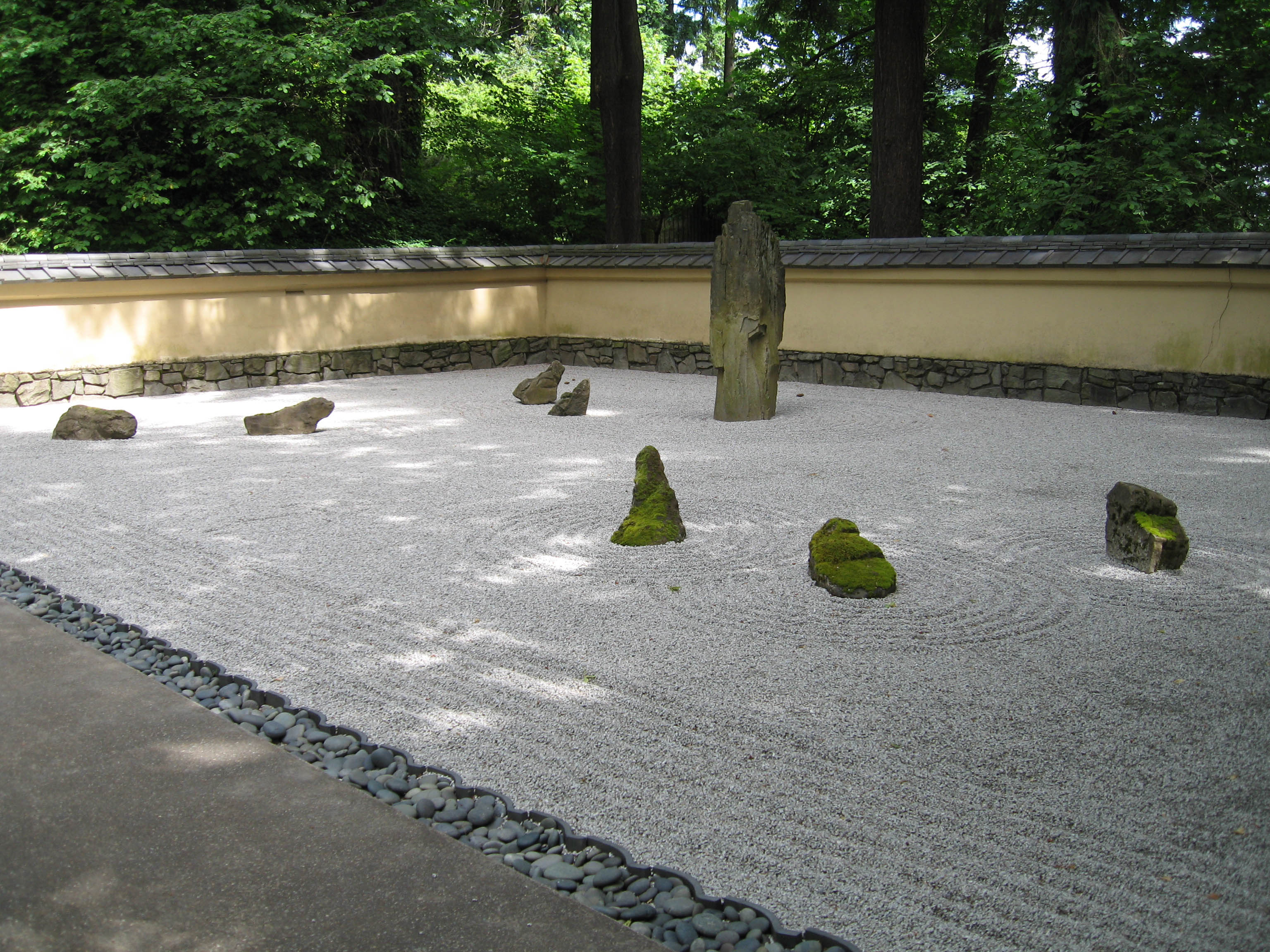
Sand and Stone Garden

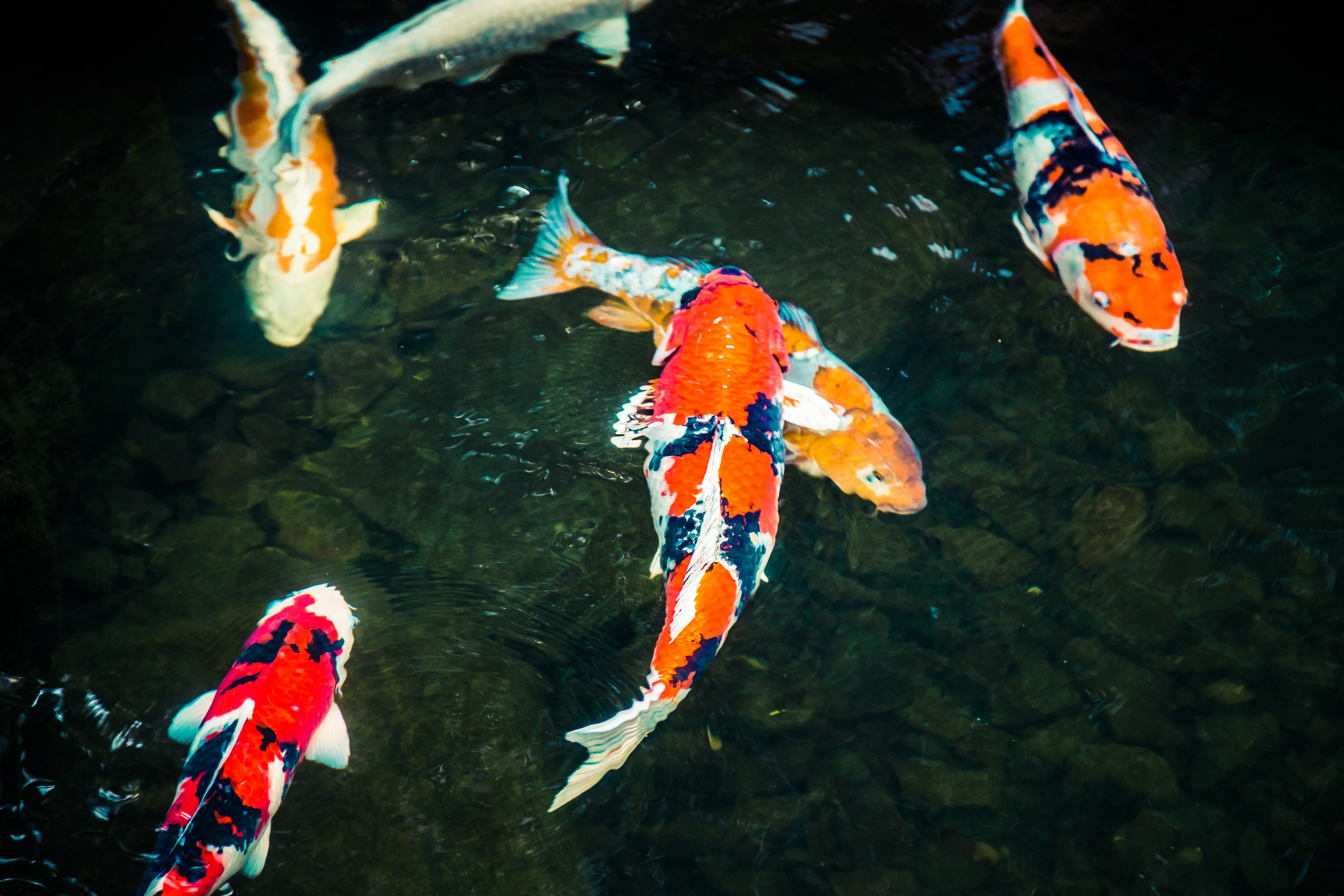
Koi pond

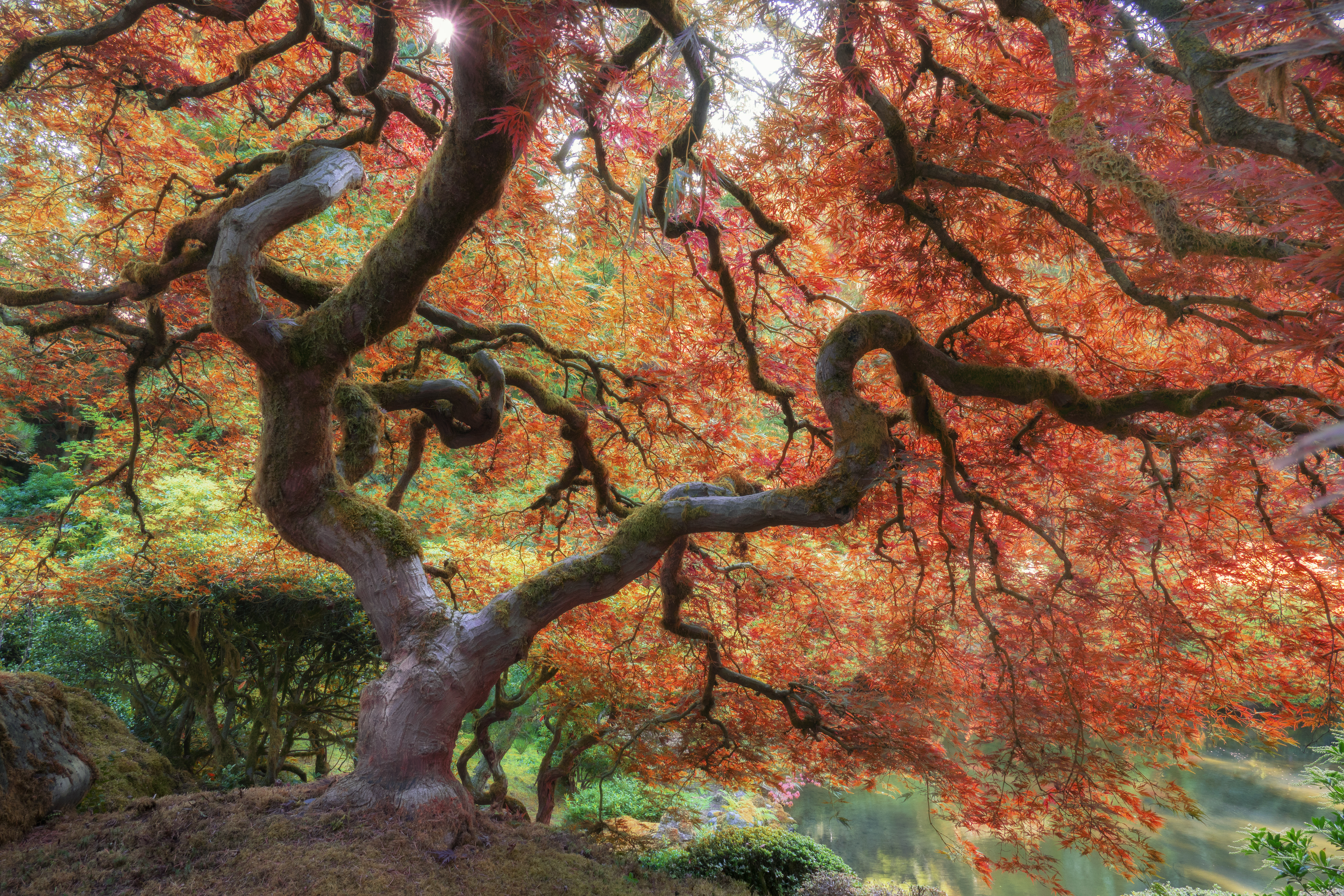
Japanese maple tree in the Strolling Pond garden

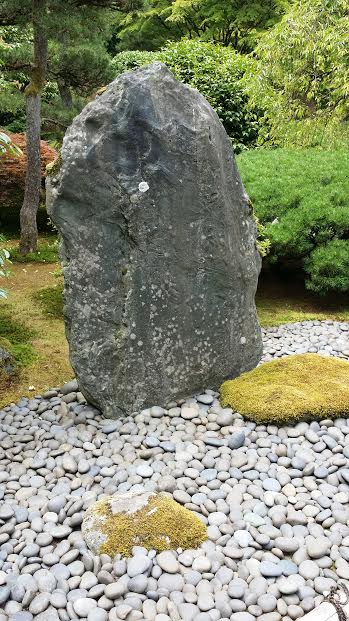
Iyo Stone

Portland Japanese Garden is a 501(c)(3) nonprofit organization, cultural institution, and public attraction in Portland, Oregon. The Garden, which opened to the public in 1967, occupies 12.5 acres (5.1 ha) in Portland's Washington Park and is adjacent to the International Rose Test Garden. Originally designed by Professor Takuma Tono of Tokyo Agricultural University, it features five historic garden spaces that demonstrate different styles of Japanese landscape architecture, a Pavilion that stages art exhibitions and shopping marketplaces, a Japanese tea house, a "Cultural Village" that hosts programming, dining, and retail, and an Entry Garden that guests walk through after purchasing admission. A tourist attraction that welcomes more than 400,000 visitors annually, Portland Japanese Garden has been proclaimed as the "most beautiful and authentic Japanese garden outside of Japan."

== History ==
Portland Japanese Garden considers its year of establishment to be 1963 when it was formed as the Japanese Garden Society of Oregon, the official name it still uses on legal documentation. Its most recent milestone anniversary was in 2023 when it celebrated 60 years.

=== Pre-garden history ===
In the years following the end of World War II, cultural and civic organizations, business leaders, and governmental officials in Portland were interested in reigniting and creating relationships with their counterparts in Japan. Progress on this goal was made in 1959 when Portland and Sapporo became sister cities following the signing of an agreement by Portland Mayor Terry Schrunk and Sapporo Mayor Yosaku Harada. Another means of pursuing friendship with Japan was one that was seen throughout the United States in this era: friendship gardens.

There had been interest in Portland in building a Japanese garden since at least the 1950s. The idea gained momentum when the Japanese Society of Oregon (today called the Japan-America Society of Oregon) formed a Garden Committee in 1959. In 1961, the Japan Society formally proposed the founding of a nonprofit organization that would plan and raise funds for a Japanese garden on the former site of the Portland Zoo in Washington Park. Backed by City Commissioner Ormond Bean, the City of Portland agreed to a 99-year lease of the old zoo site. In 1962, Mayor Schrunk created the Formal Japanese Garden Commission, which in turn would become a private nonprofit organization rebranded as the Japanese Garden Society of Oregon. In 1963, the Society held its first meeting at the offices of the Portland Parks and Recreation Bureau.

=== 1960s ===
After having agreed to a deal in principle the year prior, Professor Takuma Tono of Tokyo Agricultural University was officially hired to design the Portland Japanese Garden. He had gained some attention for his construction of a replica of Japan's Ryoanji Garden at Brooklyn Botanic Garden, a raked gravel garden and style that was less well known to Western audiences at this time. Rather than create one large garden, he instead successfully proposed creating four different spaces within the entire grounds, each reflective of a different era of in Japanese landscape architecture: a hira niwa (Flat Garden), chisen kaiyu shiki teien (Strolling Pond Garden), karesansui (Dry Gravel Garden), and roji (Tea Garden).

In 1964 the Garden hired Kinya Hira, its first Garden Director and a student of Tono at Tokyo Agricultural University. Hira was the first of a lineage of Japanese-born gardening experts to oversee Portland Japanese Garden's landscape design and maintenance that has continued throughout the organization's existence.

After approximately four years of construction, the Garden opened to the public in 1967 and saw more than 28,000 visitors. The Garden continued to see upgrades and additions after it opened. In 1968, the Garden's tea house, named Kashintei, was constructed in Japan, disassembled, shipped, and the reassembled in the organization's Tea Garden. In this same year, the Garden also built a fifth garden space under Tono's supervision that no longer exists as such: a Moss Garden.

=== 1970s ===
In the 1970s, additional updates were made to the Garden's landscape. The Moss Garden wasn't thriving as desired so it was replaced with a Natural Garden, a style known as zoki no niwa. A gate, named the "Antique Gate" by the organization, was installed at the foot of the hill leading up to the rest of the Garden. This decade also saw the arrival of the Garden's first koi and the first hosting of its annual O-Bon festival.

The 1970s also saw the visit of Takeo Fukuda, the Prime Minister of Japan, in 1978. The Oregonian reported that he was "surprised and impressed by the size and beauty of the gardens."

=== 1980s ===
In 1980, the Garden dedicated its Pavilion, a building that had been part of initial design plans but delayed in construction due to lack of funds. A ceremony was held on May 18, the same day Mount St. Helens erupted.

In 1981, the Garden remained open for winter for the first time in its history. It has remained open throughout winter since.

In 1988, Portland Japanese Garden received Nobuo Matsunaga, Ambassador of Japan to the United States. He proclaimed the Garden to be "the most beautiful and authentic Japanese garden in the world outside of Japan" and described it as a "unique treasure."

=== 1990s ===
In the 1990s, one of the few remaining buildings from the old Portland Zoo was demolished and replaced with an updated structure that became the site of the organization's first Gift Shop. It is now the site of the Garden's Membership Center.

In 1996, a Japanese water harp was installed near the Pavilion during a symposium for the International Association of Japanese Gardens held in Portland. The symposium, believed to be the first of its kind to be held anywhere, drew 200 people including a delegation from the Garden Society of Japan.

=== 2000s ===
In 2005, Portland Japanese Garden hired Steve Bloom to be its chief executive director (CEO). He would lead the organization for 20 years until his retirement in 2024.

In 2008, the Garden added regular exhibitions of traditional and contemporary Japanese art to its programming under the supervision of Curator of Culture, Art, and Education Diane Durston. The exhibition was The Quiet Voice of Metal & Stone, featuring the work of sculptor Michihiro Kosuge.

=== 2010s ===
In 2010, the Garden welcomed back all of its former Garden Directors, each a Japanese-born gardening expert, to Portland for a reunion. They included: Kinya Hira, Hoichi Kurisu, Hachiro Sakakibara, Michio Wakui, Masayuki Mizuno, Kichiro Sano, Takao Donuma, and Toru Tanaka. Sadafumi Uchiyama was part of the festivities in his role of Garden Curator.

Kengo Kuma was retained this decade to begin work on an expansion of the Garden. It would culminate in the opening of the Garden's Cultural Village in 2017, a courtyard beyond the historic garden spaces that included a small gallery, café, gift shop, a classroom, performance space, garden house, and administrative offices.

In 2015, the organization successfully returned crossbeams of a Shinto shrine gate to Hachinohe, Japan after they had washed up on Oregon's shores following a 2011 tsunami in Japan.

=== 2020s ===
In 2020, the Garden announced its new sibling organization and "global cultural initiative," Japan Institute, saying it would expand upon the programming that had already been taking place there. Among its earliest programming have been symposia in Tokyo, London, New York, Johannesburg, and Cape Town, donations of stone lanterns to Tokyo, Hiroshima, Nagasaki, and Brooklyn, and artist residencies.

== Physical spaces ==
Portland Japanese Garden initially opened to the public in 1967 on a landscape that encompassed 5.5 acres (2.2 ha). It was later expanded in 2017 to its current size of 12.5 acres (5.1 ha).

=== Historic garden spaces ===
The Garden will sometimes refer to itself as a "museum of gardens" because rather than featuring one specific garden style, its five historic spaces each represent a different approach and/or era of Japanese landscape architecture.

==== Flat Garden ====
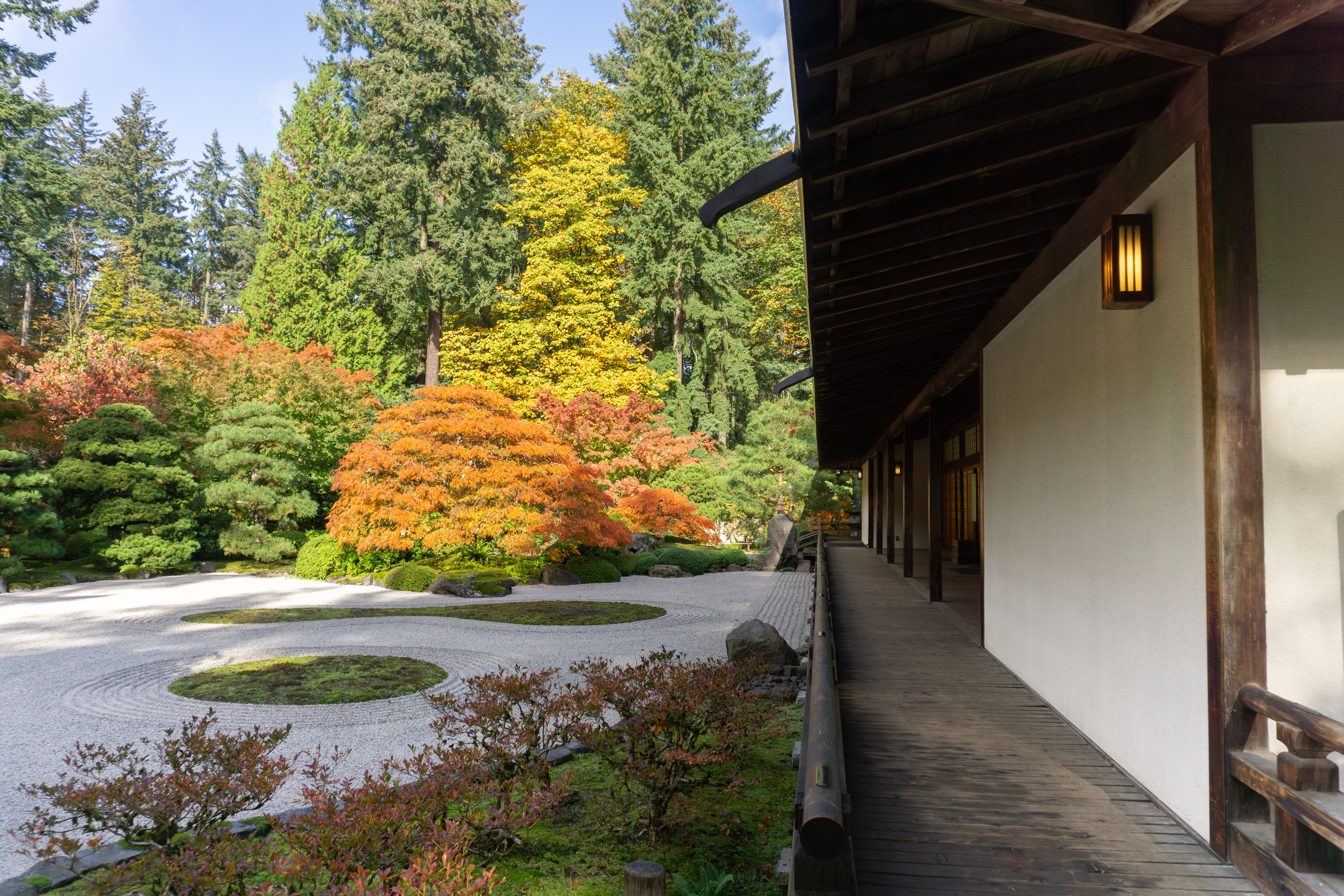
The Flat Garden, 2024

The Flat Garden (hira niwa) is an example of the evolution of the dry landscape style of the karesansui. Flat planes of the ground are balanced against stones, clipped shrubbery, and trees to create a depth of space. The Flat Garden is meant to be seen from a single viewpoint, such as from inside the Pavilion building adjacent to it or on the building's veranda.

The Pavilion has been adjacent to the Flat Garden since its construction was finished in 1980. On its eastern side, it gives a view of the City of Portland and, further into the distance, Mount Hood. The Flat Garden also has something called the "Iyo Stone," in honor of its first board president, Philip Englehart.

==== Natural Garden ====
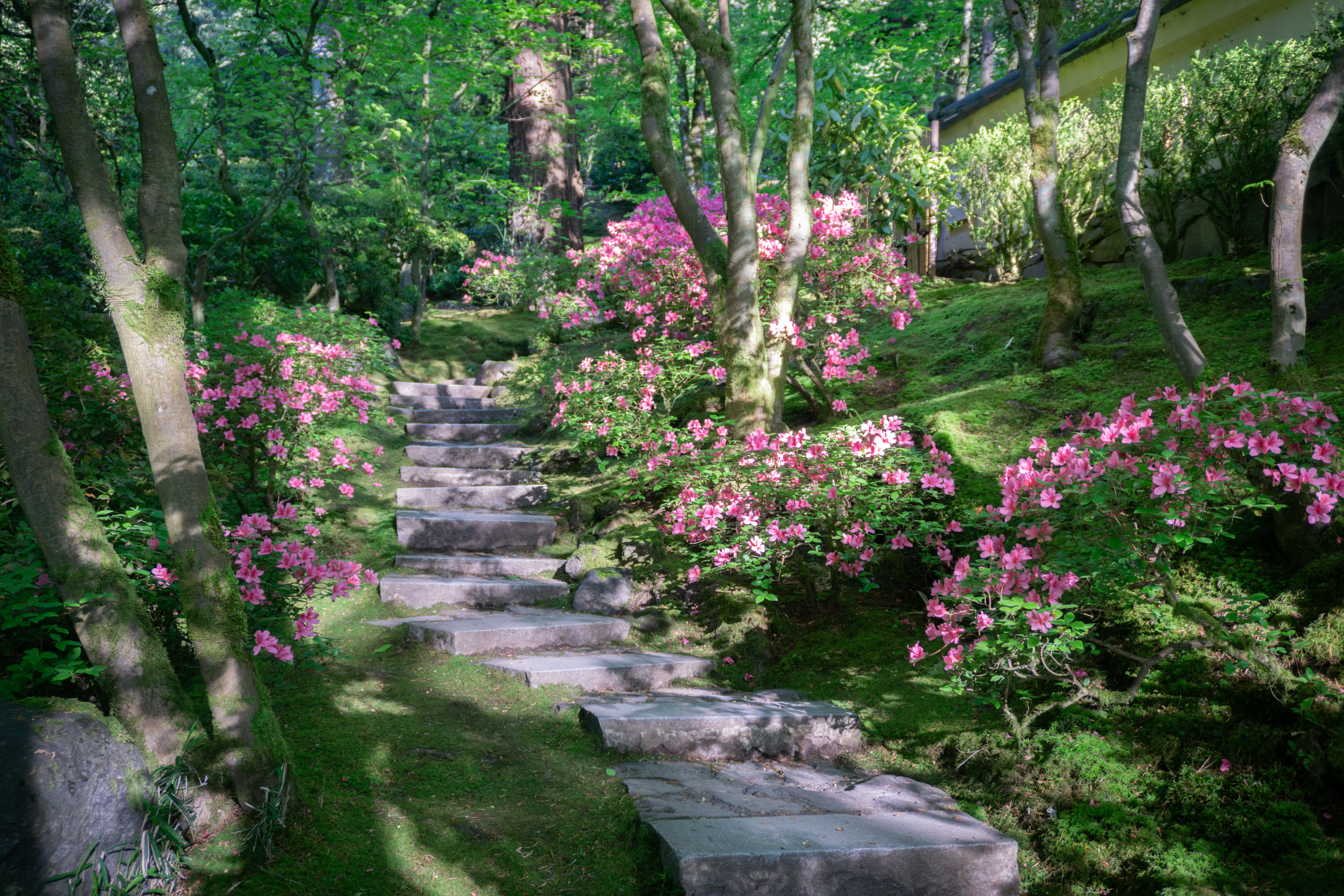
The Natural Garden, 2024

The Natural Garden is an example of the zoki no niwa style, a design approach popularized in the mid 20th century, and occupies the space previously known as the Moss Garden before the area was transformed in the 1970s. It is designed to look more like a forest than the other garden spaces and thus uses less carefully pruned plants. It features steps, small bodies of water, and a small sheltered area called a machiai.

==== Sand and Stone Garden ====
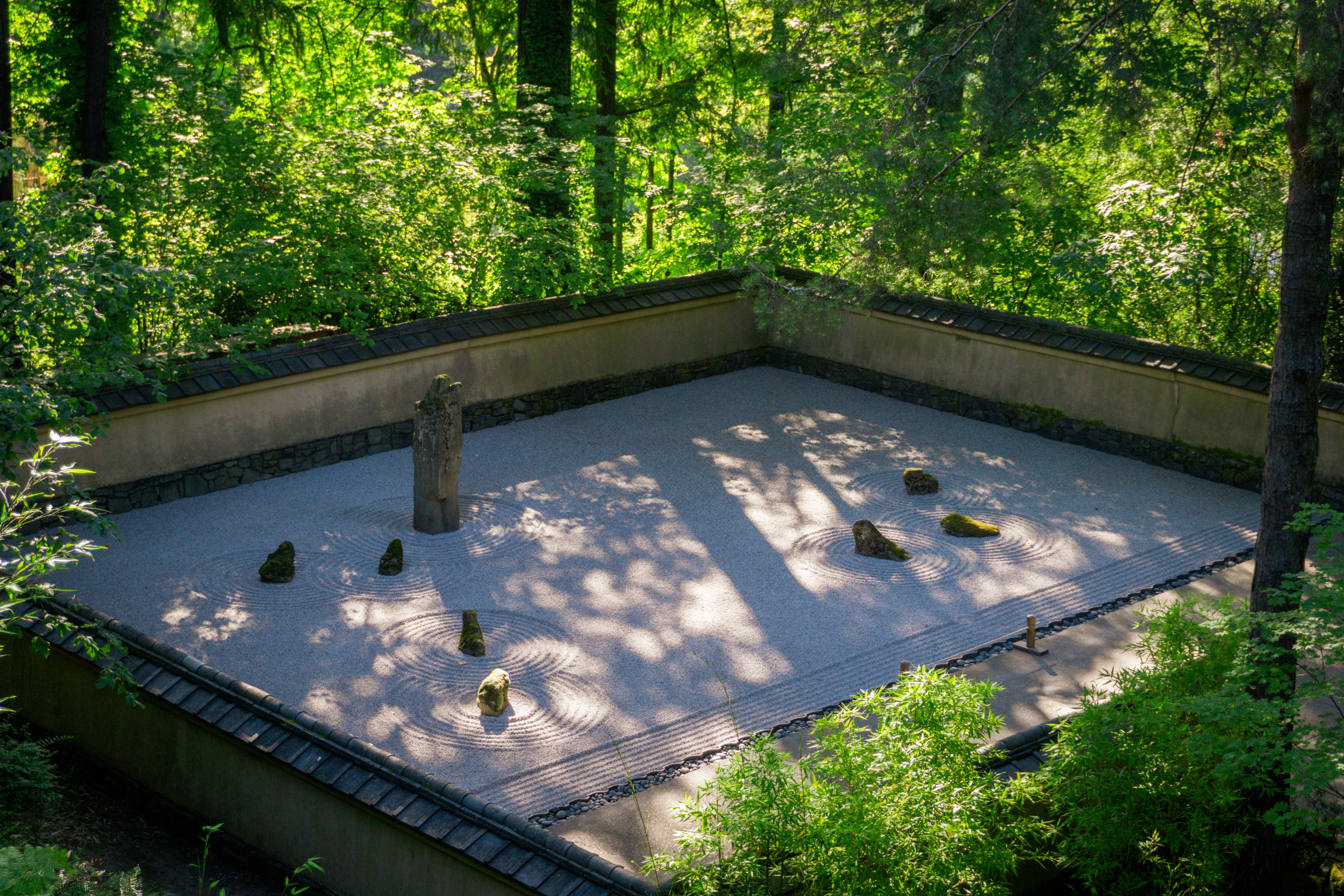
The Sand and Stone Garden, 2023

The Sand and Stone Garden is in the karesansui, or dry landscape, style with a plot of raked gravel partially surrounded by stucco walls. On top of the gravel are six moderately-sized stones and one tall stone. Tono, the original designer of Portland Japanese Garden, noted that this space can be interpreted in many ways, and offered that it can be thought to depict a story of Buddha and seven tigers.

==== Strolling Pond Garden ====
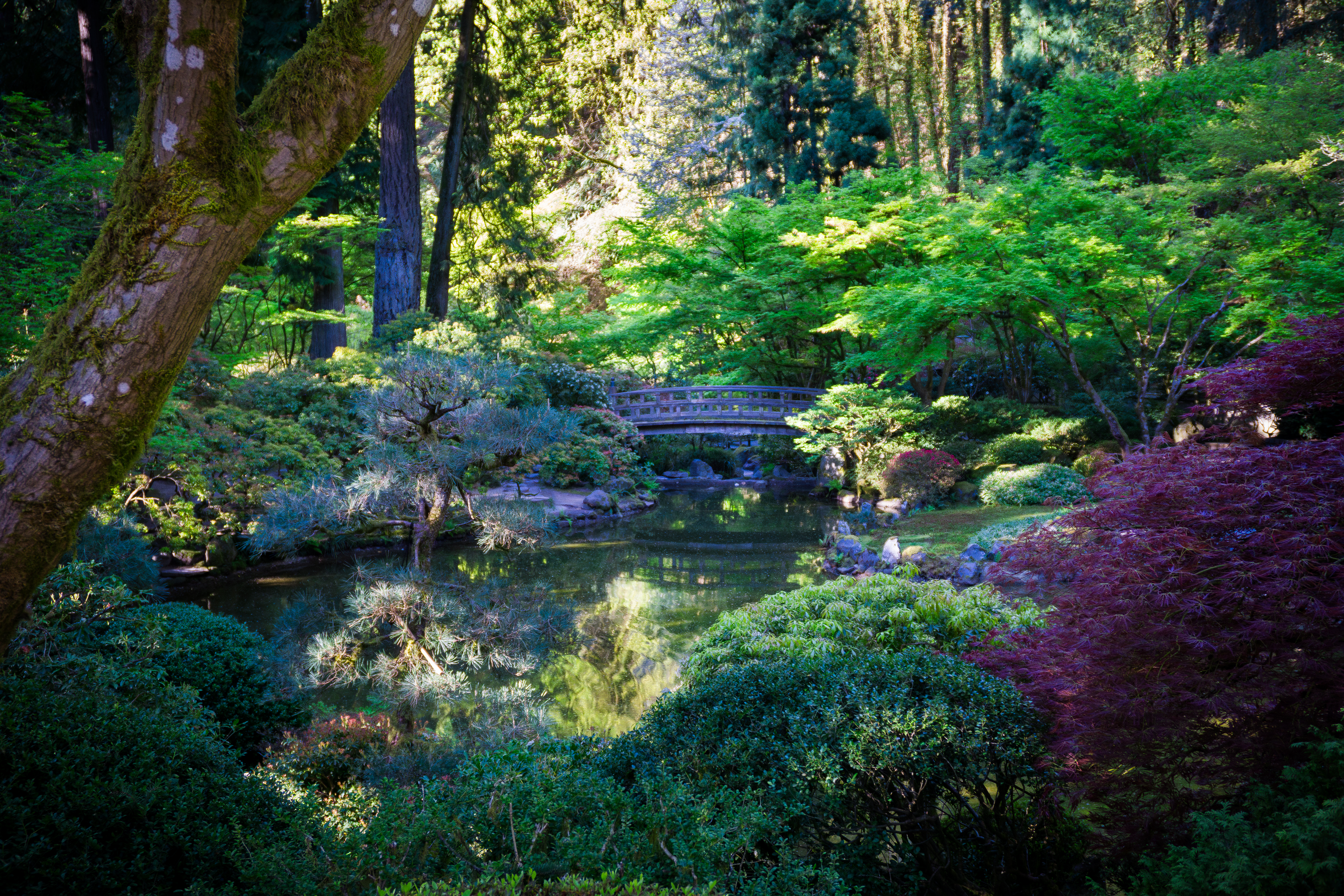
The Strolling Pond Garden, 2024

The Strolling Pond Garden depicts the chisen kaiyu shiki teien style and is the largest of the garden spaces, featuring two ponds, a waterfall, moon bridge, zig-zag bridge (yatsuhashi), hillside with cherry trees, and several stone lanterns. It depicts a style of gardens that were popular with aristocrats and daimyo, or feudal lords, during Japan's Edo period. There are several notable elements of this garden space, including:

· The Heavenly Falls is a 35-foot-tall waterfall that cascades into a large pond filled with koi. It is built in an area that had been a bear cave when the Portland Zoo had been operating on the landscape. It was damaged in 1997 and rebuilt under the supervision of the organization's second Garden Director, Hoichi Kurisu.

· The Koto-Ji Lantern was a gift from the City of Kanazawa to Portland Japanese Garden and is a replica of a notable lantern in Kenroku-en, one of Japan's most famous gardens.

· The Peace Lantern is a small stone lantern that was gifted by the Mayor of Yokohama in the 1950s. Originally placed in Portland's International Rose Test Garden, it was moved to the Japanese garden in the 1960s. Inscribed in it are the words "Casting the Light of Everlasting Peace."

· The Sapporo Pagoda Lantern was a gift from the City of Sapporo to its sister city, Portland, for the purposes of placing it in Portland Japanese Garden. It was first displayed at Portland Art Museum while the Garden prepared the ground to bear its weight.

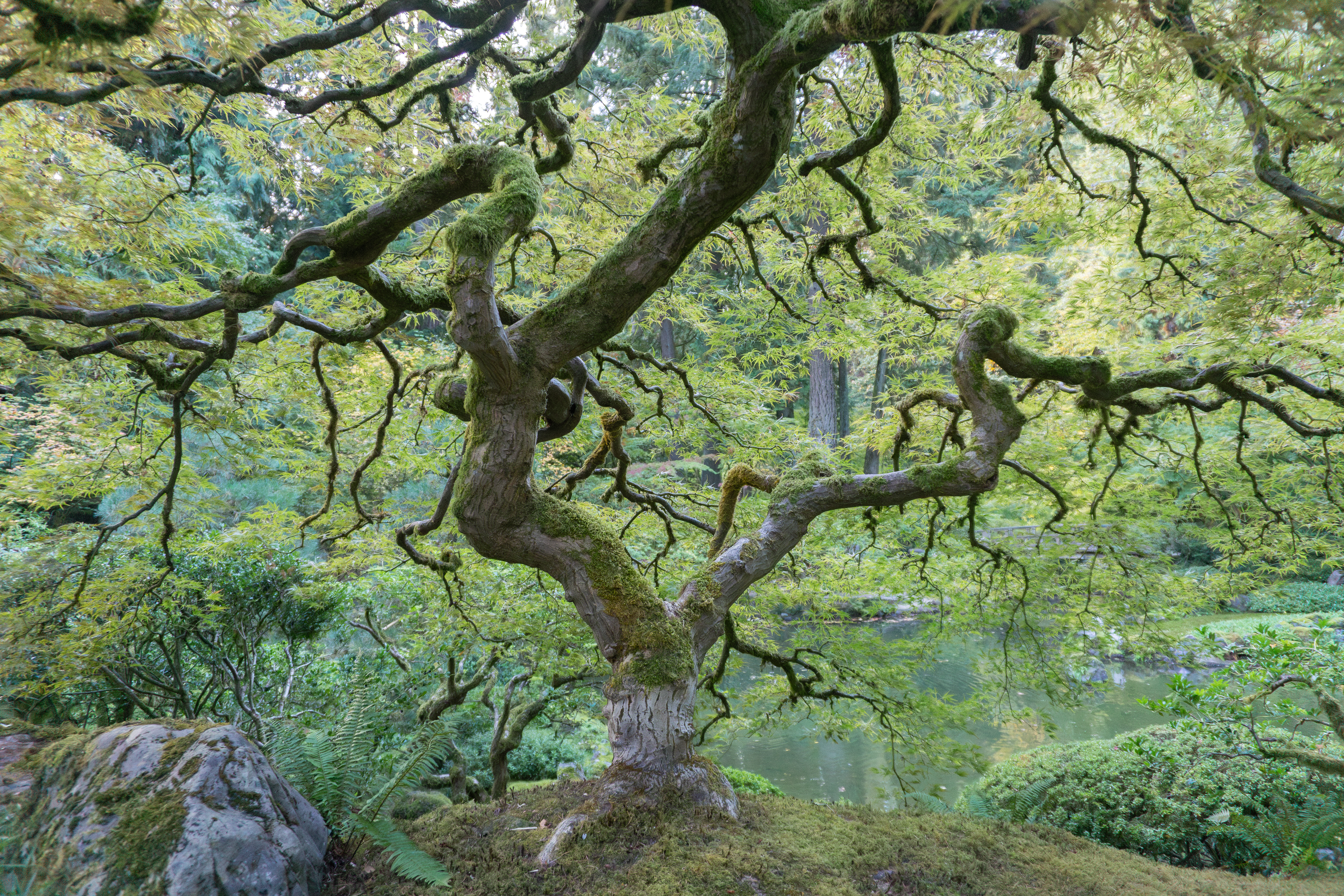
"The Tree," a tree claimed to be among the most photographed in North America

· "The" Tree is a Japanese maple tree that has gained worldwide attention after having been featured in a National Geographic photo contest. In fall, when it changes colors, it attracts photographers from around the world.

==== Tea Garden ====
The Tea Garden, 2025

The Tea Garden is of the roji style and depicts an approach that started to gain popularity in the Momoyama and Edo periods. It features a stepstone path that leads to a tea house, which has been named Kashintei ("Flower-Heart Room") by the organization. The tea house was first built in Japan in 1962 by Kajima Construction Company, disassembled, shipped to Oregon, and then re-assembled in Portland Japanese Garden in 1968.

=== Cultural Village ===
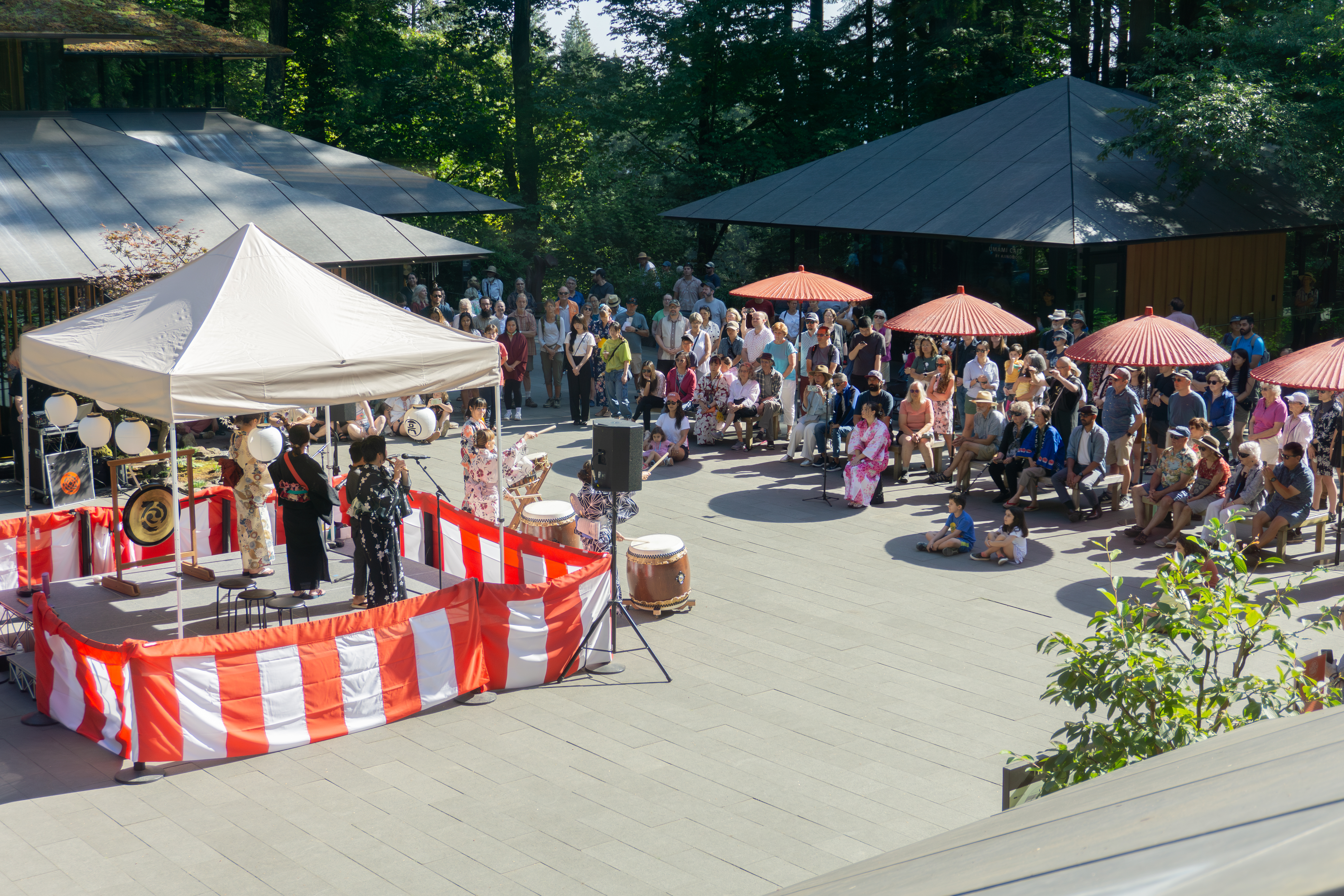
Bon-Odori celebration in the Cultural Village, 2024

In 2017, Portland Japanese Garden unveiled its new Cultural Village, a complex of buildings and outdoor spaces designed by architect Kengo Kuma and the organization's Curator Emeritus, Sadafumi Uchiyama.

==== Jordan Schnitzer Japanese Arts Learning Center ====
The largest building in the Cultural Village, the Learning Center features several different spaces:

- The Calvin and Mayho Tanabe Gallery is a small exhibition space that shows both traditional and contemporary Japanese art.
- The Cathy Rudd Cultural Corner is a space that features a rotation of different demonstrations and performances related to Japanese horticultural arts, tea ceremony, and music. People who attend sit in the Jan Miller Living Room, a space dominated by staircase seating.
- The Gift Shop moved to this location in 2017 following the completion of the building's construction. It features a variety of goods, including several from Japan.
- The Vollum Library holds over 3,000 publications related to Japanese gardens, arts, and culture. In its center is a table made by George Nakashima.
- The Yanai Family Classroom is a space for programming, including lectures, workshops, and receptions.

==== The Ron and Jenny Herman Garden House ====
The Ron and Jenny Herman Garden House is a space that features the organization's Family Studio, a space that includes light activities for children and their parents. The rest of the building consists mostly of offices and workspaces.

==== Umami Café ====
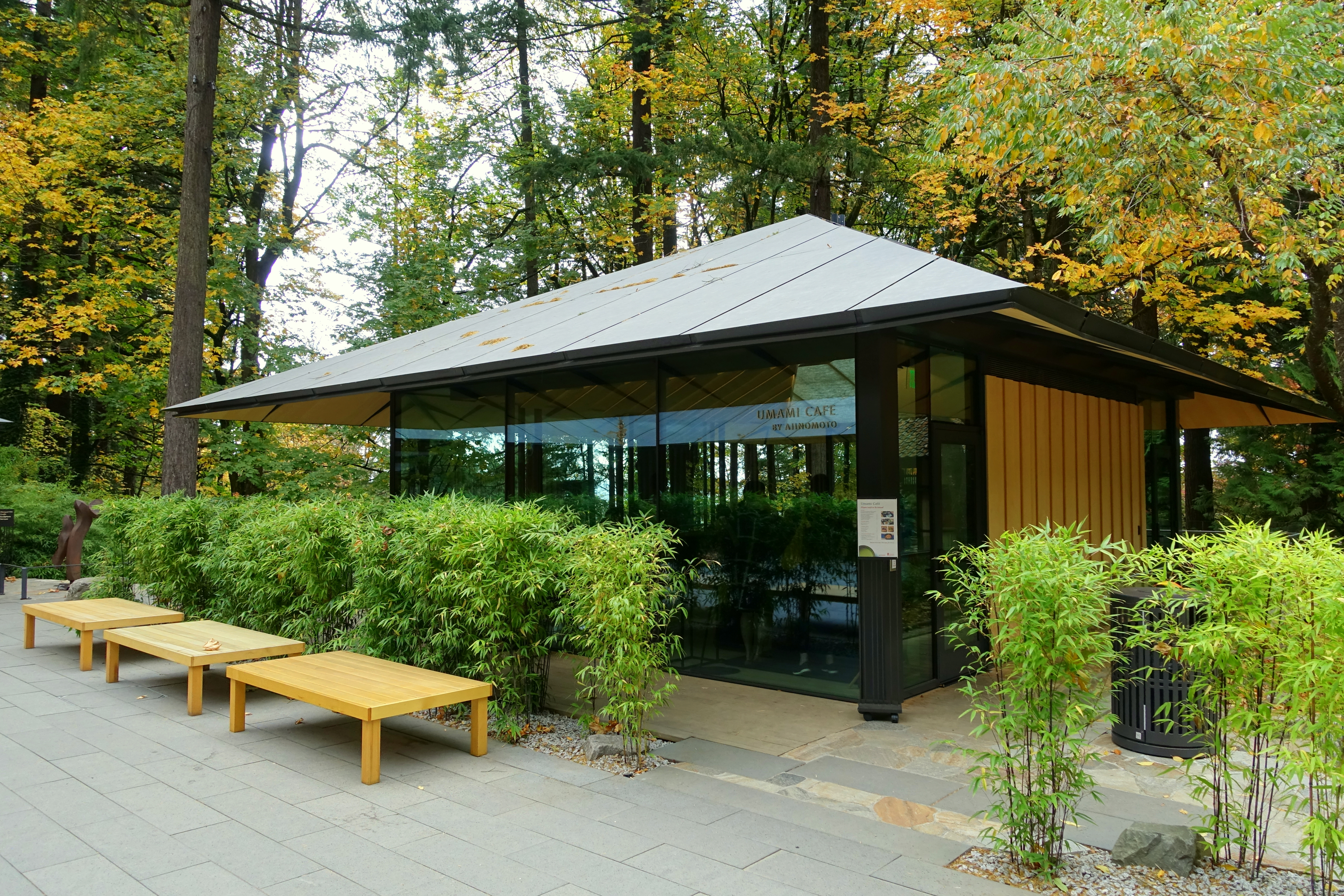
The Umami Café

The Umami Café is a space that is cantilevered over a hillside. It serves green teas and light bites, including Japanese sweets and more savory items like miso soup.

==== Ellie M. Hill Bonsai Terrace ====
The bonsai terrace, while open year-round, features a rotating assemblage of loaned bonsai mid-spring through fall.

==== Jubitz Oregon Terrace ====
The Jubitz Oregon Terrace is a space that is accessible through the second floor of the Jordan Schnitzer Japanese Arts Learning Center. It includes a water feature and bonsai mid-spring through fall.

==== Tsubo-niwa ====
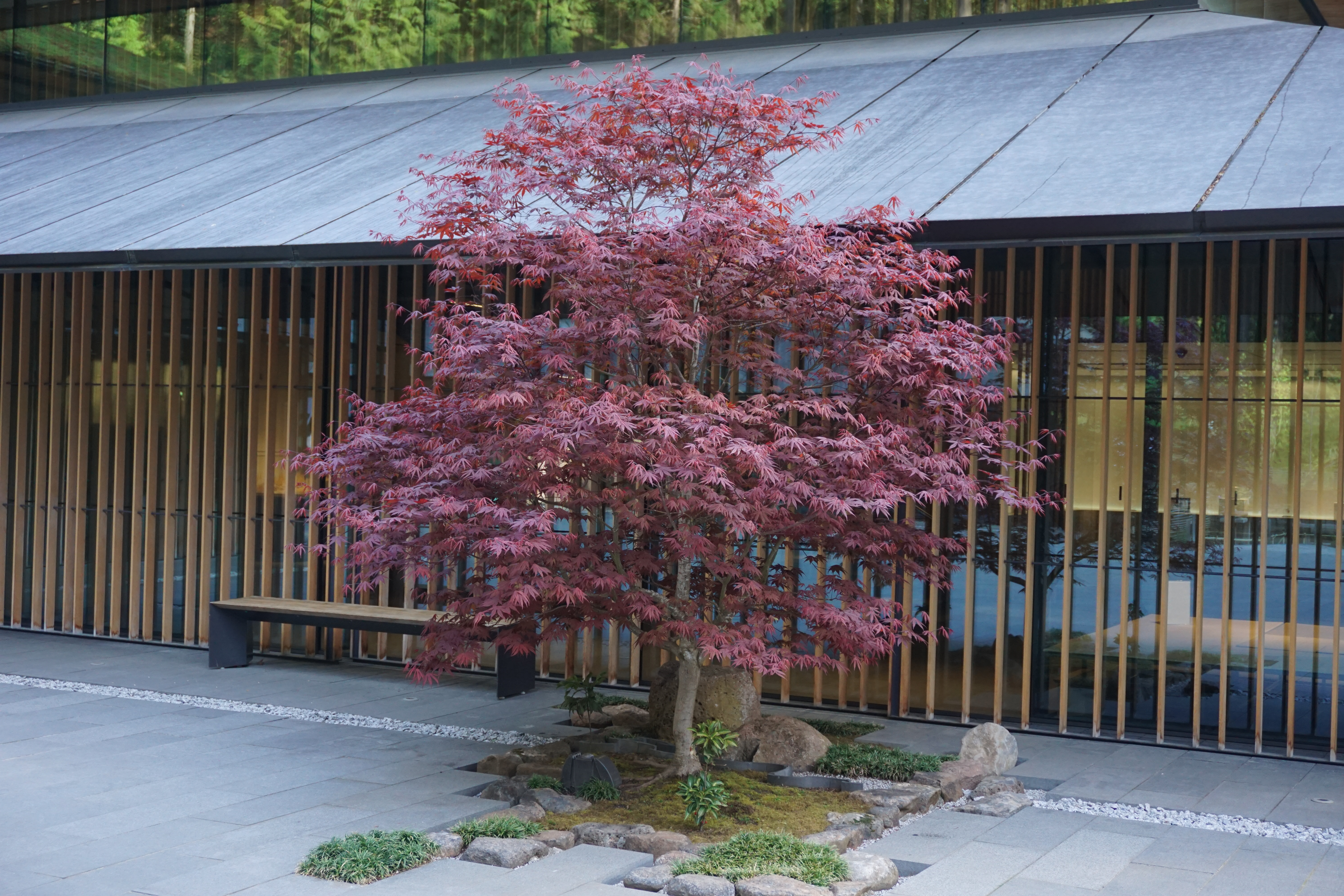
A tsubo-niwa at Portland Japanese Garden

The smallest of the organization's garden spaces, the tsubo-niwa is an example of a small courtyard garden and features a Japanese maple surrounded by a small bed of moss.

=== Entry Garden ===
The Entry Garden is what guests to Portland Japanese Garden pass through after purchasing admission at its Calvin and Mayho Tanabe Welcome Center. While designed to be aesthetically pleasing, it also helps serve the purpose of slowing the speed of which water comes down the hillside, a necessary touch after installing a granite courtyard and multiple buildings on the hilltop.

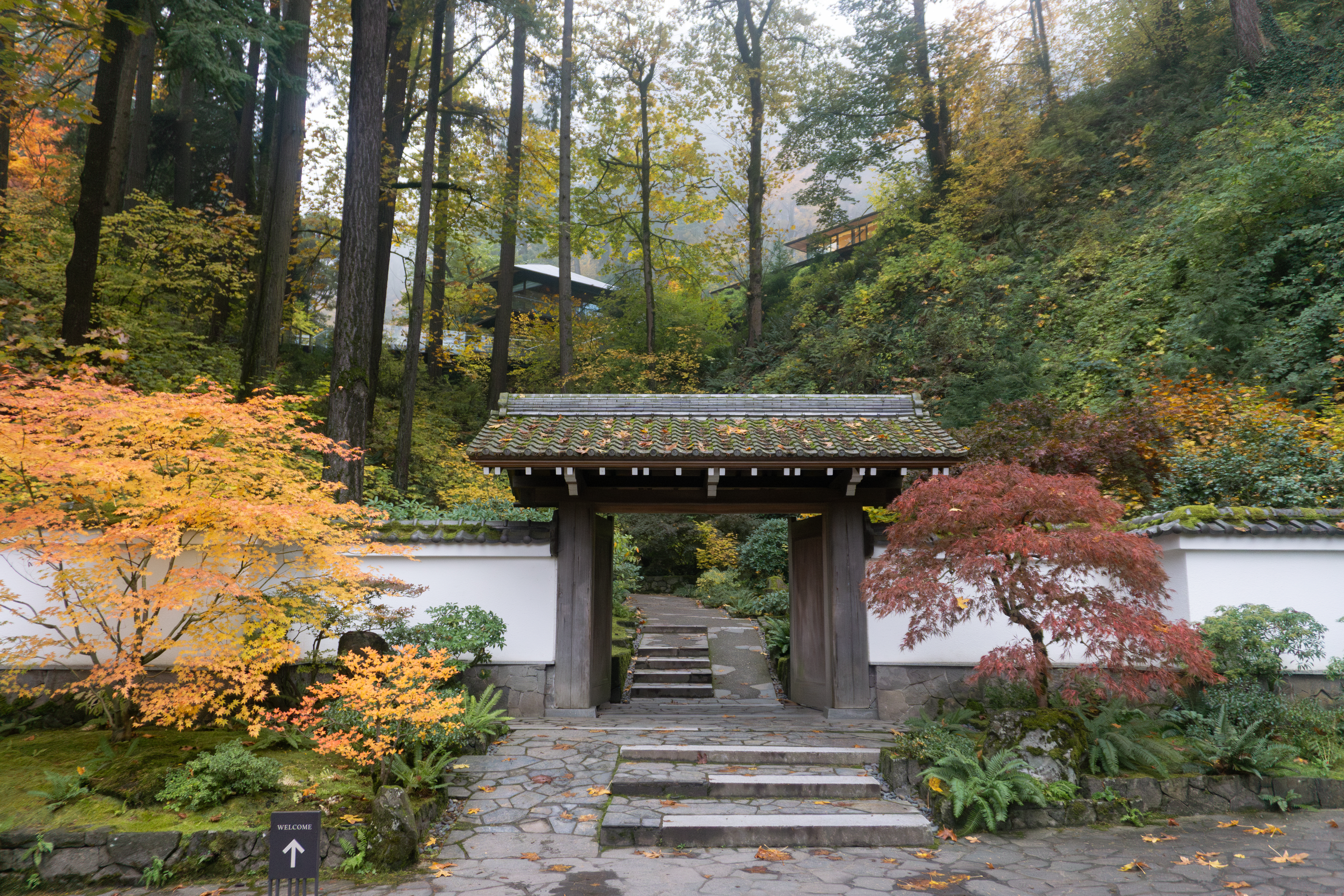
The Entry Garden, 2024

== Programming ==
Portland Japanese Garden is also a cultural organization that offers a variety of programming. This includes:

- Art exhibitions in its Pavilion and Calvin and Mayho Tanabe Galleries, featuring an array of artists and media that explore traditional and contemporary Japanese art and design. Among the artists that have been featured is Noritaka Tatehana in his first U.S. exhibition.
- Botanical exhibitions of Japanese cultural pursuits such as ikebana and bonsai.
- Classes and workshops covering a range of activities including Japanese stitching techniques, ikebana, kintsugi, tree pruning, and bamboo fence building.
- Cultural festivals celebrating some of Japan's most important holidays, including O-Shogatsu (Japanese New Year), Hina Matsuri (Doll Festival), Kodomo no Hi (Children's Day), Tanabata (Star Festival), O-Bon (Spirit Festival), and Bon-Odori (Summer Festival).
- Demonstrations and performances encompassing cultural pursuits such as bonsai, ikebana, tea ceremony, koto music, shamisen, and more.
- Lectures on a range of Japanese subjects, typically involving nature, art, culture, design, traditions, and/or history.
- Tours of the Garden, some being exclusive to members, ASL-friendly tours, and mindfulness tours.

== Japan Institute ==
Established in 2020, Japan Institute is the programmatic arm of Portland Japanese Garden and its global cultural initiative. In the years it has existed, it has led a variety of programming:

- Global Peace Symposia in Tokyo, London, New York, Cape Town, and Johannesburg, all featuring presentations, poetry readings, panel discussions, and networking events centered on the themes of nature, art, and culture.
- Artist Residencies featuring the work of Japanese artists who stay in Portland to work on exhibitions that are shown at Portland Japanese Garden. Rui Sasaki was the inaugural Artist-in-Residence for Japan Institute in 2023.
- Japanese Garden Seminars and workshops through the Japanese Garden Training Center, a facility that blends traditional methods and techniques with more modern Western approaches to education.

== Memberships and volunteering ==
As of 2025, an individual membership to Portland Japanese Garden is $70 per year, with options to scale up to other tiers that offer more exclusive access to the organization's landscape and programming. All membership levels include devoted member hours every day the Garden is open from 8–10am. The Garden also offers a "Moon Bridge Membership" for $20 per year to Oregon and Southwest Washington families that are receiving public income-related assistance.

There are multiple ways to volunteer at the Garden, including:

- Bonsai Docents are stationed at the Ellie M. Hill Bonsai Terrace and provide further information on the bonsai on display.
- Cultural Village Hosts are in the organization's Cultural Village to help greet people and familiarize them with the space and events taking place that day.
- Exhibition Docents volunteer in the Pavilion Gallery and help educate visitors who come in to view the organization's art exhibition.
- Event Volunteers assist the organization's Culture, Arts, and Events departments to host its larger programming, including receptions and cultural festivals.
- Garden Ambassadors who provide information to guests about the organization's history, philosophy, and design principles as well as support Visitor Relations staff by answering questions and helping orient people through the landscape.
- Horticulture Support Volunteers work alongside the organization's gardeners to assist in the upkeep and maintenance of the grounds, including weeding, raking, sweeping, and cleaning up.
- Office Volunteers support back-of-house staff in projects involving its Development and Membership Departments, including assembling mailings, making nametags, and putting together gift bags.
- Tour Guides give public, private, and school tours of the Garden, providing a detailed and nuanced overview of the organization's history, mission, principles, and landscape attributes.
- Welcome Center Greeters are near the Calvin and Mahyo Tanabe Welcome Center and engage with guests in line to help set them up for the best Garden experience possible.

== See also ==
- List of botanical gardens and arboretums in the United States
- List of Japanese gardens in the United States
- Lan Su Chinese Garden
