= Chesterfield, Missouri =

City in St. Louis County, Missouri, United States

- City
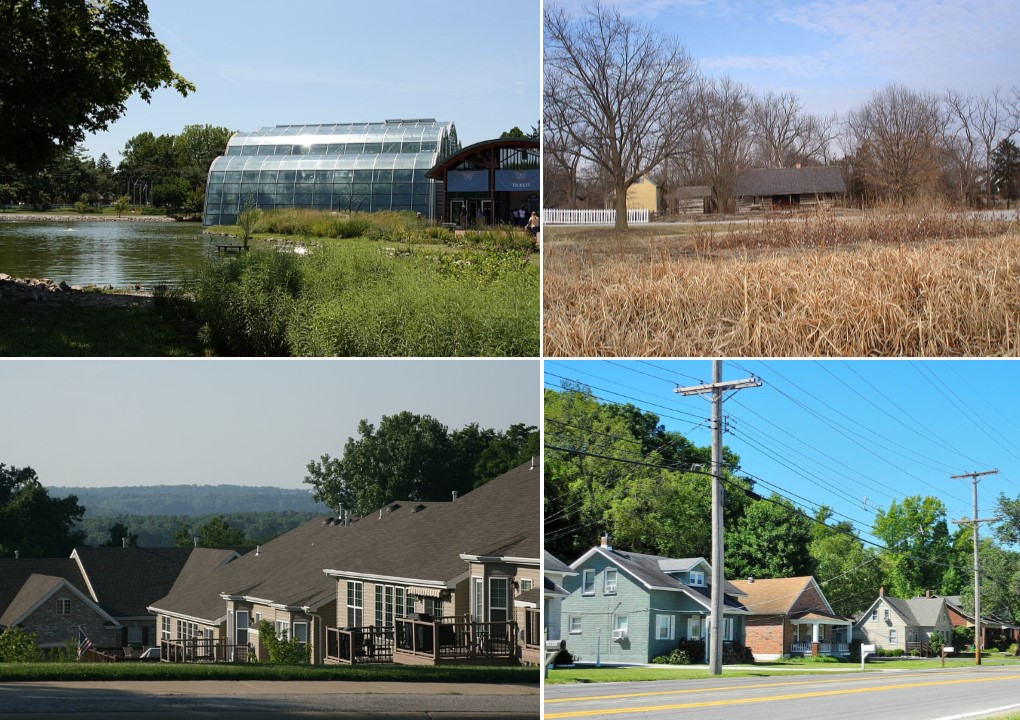
- From top left: Butterfly House, Faust Park, Residential area, Old Chesterfield

- Location of Chesterfield, Missouri
- Coordinates: 38°39′32″N 90°34′49″W
- Country: United States
- State: Missouri
- County: St. Louis
- Townships: Chesterfield, Lafayette, Maryland Heights, Missouri River
- Incorporated: 1988

Government
  - Mayor: Dan Hurt

Area
  - Total: 33.84 sq mi (87.64 km^{2})
  - Land: 31.83 sq mi (82.45 km^{2})
  - Water: 2.00 sq mi (5.19 km^{2})
- Elevation: 515 ft (157 m)

Population (2020)
  - Total: 49,999
  - Density: 1,571/sq mi (606.4/km^{2})
- Time zone: UTC−6 (Central (CST))
  - Summer (DST): UTC−5 (CDT)
- Zip code: 63005, 63017
- Area codes: 314, 636
- FIPS code: 29-13600
- GNIS feature ID: 2393821
- Website: chesterfield.mo.us

Chesterfield is a city in St. Louis County, Missouri, United States. It is a western suburb of St. Louis. As of the 2020 census, the population was 49,999, making it the state's 14th most populous city. The broader valley of Chesterfield was originally referred to as "Gumbo Flats", derived from its soil, which though very rich and silty, resembled gumbo when wet.

== History ==
=== Ancient history ===
Present-day Chesterfield is known to have been a site of Native American inhabitation for thousands of years. A site in western Chesterfield containing artwork and carvings has been dated as 4,000 years old. A Mississippian site, dated to around the year 1000, containing the remains of what have been identified as a market and ceremonial center, is also located in modern Chesterfield.

=== Historical communities ===
The present-day city of Chesterfield is made up of several smaller historical communities, including:

- Bellefontaine (French for "beautiful spring"), or as the locals called it, "Hilltown", dates to about 1837 with the arrival of August Hill. The first post office was established as Bellemonte ("beautiful mountain") in 1851. Eighteen years later, in 1869, the town and post office name were both changed to Bellefontaine. Rinkel's Market was a familiar landmark for years, at the intersection of present-day Olive Boulevard and Chesterfield Parkway.
- The town of Lake started out as "Hog Hollow," in about 1850. The post office was established as Hog Hollow in 1871, but a year later the town's name was changed to what some thought was the more suitable name of Lake. Zierenberg's General Merchandise and Saloon (built around 1880) was a well-known landmark at the 18-mile marker on Olive Street Road. The original structure was destroyed by fire in 1918. It was replaced by the existing structure on the same site (Olive Boulevard and Hog Hollow Road).
- Gumbo is located in the valley at the present intersection of Chesterfield Airport Road and Long Road. A notable landmark (until it was razed in 1998) was the old Twenty Five Mile House - so named because of its distance from downtown St. Louis. Gumbo's name derived from its soil, which though very rich and silty, when wet became gumbo mud. A substance very similar to gravel was made from Gumbo mud and used for streets and sidewalks in Forest Park during the 1904 World's Fair. Gumbo's post office operated from 1882 to 1907.
- Monarch (earlier called Atherton, then Eatherton) was one of the settlements that sprang up along the Chicago, Rock Island and Pacific rail line when it came through the valley in the late 1870s. William Sutton's General Store stood on the northwest corner of Eatherton and Centaur Roads. Their post office operated from 1895 to 1907, when the mail was transferred to Chesterfield. A well-known residence in Monarch was named "The Shadows"; it still survives, with a commanding view from its bluff site.
- Bonhomme, which is French for "good man," is located at the extreme western end of Olive Street Road. It had a blacksmith shop, grist mill, store, post office and Fenn's saw mill; but it was all washed away in the late 19th century by the Missouri River. Bonhomme was a popular name in St. Louis County; with Bonhomme streets, roads, creeks, churches and townships still so-named. However, this Bonhomme is the only one that ever had its own post office.

=== 1967 tornado ===
On January 24, 1967, a violent F4 tornado ripped a 21-mile (34 km) path of destruction across St. Louis County. It was the fourth-worst tornado to hit the St. Louis metro area and the most recent F4 tornado to hit the city. The tornado developed near the Chesterfield Manor nursing home and then moved through River Bend Estates and across northeast St. Louis County.

=== Incorporation as Chesterfield ===
The name "Chesterfield" was given by landowner Justus Post who arrived in Missouri in 1815 and began amassing an estate in the location of the present-day city. Post had grown up in Vermont, not far from the town of Chesterfield, New Hampshire, which sits on the border between New Hampshire and Vermont. Although Post eventually left Missouri and moved to Illinois, his chosen placename of "Chesterfield" stuck.

For many years, "Chesterfield" was an all-inclusive place-name for a vast, unincorporated sub-region of western St. Louis County (called "West County" by metro area residents) containing the unincorporated historical communities listed above, plus areas now incorporated as cities of their own (e.g., Ballwin). Police and fire protection in the community were fragmented and sporadic, the former provided by St. Louis County. As the population grew, Chesterfield Mall and other retail and commercial real estate developments sprang up; however, many residents were concerned about the lack of quality public services, and that the municipal sales tax benefited the county instead of the community.

An organization was formed calling itself the "Chesterfield Incorporation Study Committee." Headed by its president, John A. Nuetzel (himself a former president of the River Bend Association, a zoning watchdog group), the members "passed the hat" at neighborhood meetings, engaged legal help, drew up metes and bounds, and forced several failed public votes for incorporation. After a number of years, in 1988, The City of Chesterfield was finally established by its residents and their families, and has thrived as perhaps West County's premier residential, business, retail, and transportation center.

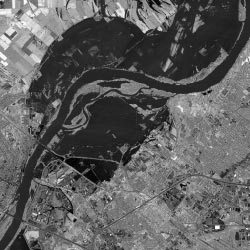
Satellite image of the Missouri River during the Great Flood of 1993.

=== Flood of 1993 ===
On July 30, 1993, the levee that protected Gumbo Flats (now known as the Chesterfield Valley) from the Missouri River failed. This was the first time the levee had failed since 1935. The town was told to evacuate, and the whole area of Gumbo Flats was flooded by feet of water. Today, the area has become the Chesterfield Commons retail area.

=== Scientific history ===
At the Chesterfield Village Research Center the first work on genetically modified organisms took place, with the first genetically modified potato being grown on 2 June 1987.

== Geography ==
Chesterfield is located approximately 25 miles (40 km) west of St. Louis. According to the United States Census Bureau, the city has a total area of 33.52 square miles (86.82 km^{2}), of which 31.78 square miles (82.31 km^{2}) is land and 1.74 square miles (4.51 km^{2}) is water.

Portions of Chesterfield are located in the floodplain of the Missouri River, now known as Chesterfield Valley, formerly as Gumbo Flats. Here several small creeks empty into the Missouri River (Caulks Creek and Bonhomme Creek). This area was submerged during the Great Flood of 1993; higher levees built since then have led to extensive commercial development in the valley. Chesterfield Valley is the location of Spirit of St. Louis Airport, used for corporate aviation, as well as the longest outdoor strip mall in America.

== Demographics ==
Historical population
Census	Pop.	Note	%±
1990	37,991		—
2000	46,802		23.2%
2010	47,484		1.5%
2020	49,999		5.3%
U.S. Decennial Census 2020

=== Racial and ethnic composition ===
Chesterfield city, Missouri – Racial and ethnic composition Note: the US Census treats Hispanic/Latino as an ethnic category. This table excludes Latinos from the racial categories and assigns them to a separate category. Hispanics/Latinos may be of any race.
Race / Ethnicity (NH = Non-Hispanic)	Pop 2000	Pop 2010	Pop 2020	% 2000	% 2010	% 2020
White alone (NH)	42,190	40,163	37,513	90.15%	84.58%	75.03%
Black or African American alone (NH)	867	1,235	1,571	1.85%	2.60%	3.14%
Native American or Alaska Native alone (NH)	54	63	61	0.12%	0.13%	0.12%
Asian alone (NH)	2,591	4,076	7,178	5.54%	8.58%	14.36%
Native Hawaiian or Pacific Islander alone (NH)	7	14	19	0.01%	0.03%	0.04%
Other race alone (NH)	42	43	150	0.09%	0.09%	0.30%
Mixed race or Multiracial (NH)	325	567	1,738	0.69%	1.19%	3.48%
Hispanic or Latino (any race)	726	1,323	1,769	1.55%	2.79%	3.54%
Total	46,802	47,484	49,999	100.00%	100.00%	100.00%

=== 2020 census ===
As of the 2020 census, Chesterfield had a population of 49,999 and 20,051 households; the census reported 13,458 families residing in the city.

The median age was 46.6 years. 20.8% of residents were under the age of 18 and 25.7% were 65 years of age or older. For every 100 females there were 93.4 males, and for every 100 females age 18 and over there were 90.3 males age 18 and over.

Of all households, 28.1% had children under the age of 18 living in them. 61.7% were married-couple households, 12.8% were households with a male householder and no spouse or partner present, and 22.6% were households with a female householder and no spouse or partner present. About 25.6% of all households were made up of individuals and 13.8% had someone living alone who was 65 years of age or older.

There were 21,306 housing units, of which 5.9% were vacant. The homeowner vacancy rate was 1.1% and the rental vacancy rate was 11.4%.

99.5% of residents lived in urban areas, while 0.5% lived in rural areas.

Racial composition as of the 2020 census
Race	Number	Percent
White	37,886	75.8%
Black or African American	1,591	3.2%
American Indian and Alaska Native	87	0.2%
Asian	7,192	14.4%
Native Hawaiian and Other Pacific Islander	21	0.0%
Some other race	529	1.1%
Two or more races	2,693	5.4%
Hispanic or Latino (of any race)	1,769	3.5%

=== Income ===
According to the 2007–2011 American Community Survey estimate, the median income for a household in the city was $95,006, and the median income for a family was $88,568. Males had a median income of $94,322 versus $54,934 for females. The per capita income for the city was $51,725. About 1.7% of families and 4.0% of the population were below the poverty line, including 1.7% of those under age 18 and 3.3% of those age 65 or over.

The 2016–2020 5-year American Community Survey estimates show that the median household income was $120,394 (with a margin of error of +/- $10,152) and the median family income was $150,240 (+/- $8,440). Males had a median income of $92,020 (+/- $6,293) versus $44,789 (+/- $4,524) for females. The median income for those above 16 years old was $65,404 (+/- $5,414). Approximately, 1.8% of families and 3.9% of the population were below the poverty line, including 3.8% of those under the age of 18 and 3.5% of those ages 65 or over.

=== 2010 census ===
As of the census of 2010, there were 47,484 people, 19,224 households, and 13,461 families living in the city. The population density was 1,494.1 inhabitants per square mile (576.9/km^{2}). There were 20,393 housing units at an average density of 641.7 per square mile (247.8/km^{2}). The racial makeup of the city was 86.5% White, 2.6% African American, 0.2% Native American, 8.6% Asian, 0.7% from other races, and 1.4% from two or more races. Hispanic or Latino of any race were 2.8% of the population.

There were 19,224 households, of which 29.3% had children under the age of 18 living with them, 62.2% were married couples living together, 5.9% had a female householder with no husband present, 2.0% had a male householder with no wife present, and 30.0% were non-families. 26.1% of all households were made up of individuals, and 11.6% had someone living alone who was 65 years of age or older. The average household size was 2.42 and the average family size was 2.94.

The median age in the city was 46.6 years. 22.3% of residents were under the age of 18; 5.7% were between the ages of 18 and 24; 19.5% were from 25 to 44; 32.5% were from 45 to 64; and 20.1% were 65 years of age or older. The gender makeup of the city was 47.8% male and 52.2% female.

== Economy ==
Reinsurance Group of America, Dierbergs, Kellwood, Amdocs, Aegion and Broadstripe have their headquarters in Chesterfield. Chesterfield has three malls, two of which are outlet malls as well as a strip mall called the Chesterfield Commons.

=== Top employers ===
According to the city's 2013 Comprehensive Annual Financial Report, the top employers in the city are:

#	Employer	Employees
1	St. Luke's Hospital	3,447
2	Parkway School District	1,195
3	Bayer	1,011
4	Delmar Gardens Enterprises	913
5	Reinsurance Group of America	780
6	Dierbergs Markets	485
7	Amdocs	455
8	Mercy Health	430
9	McBride & Son Companies	400
10	MOHELA	379

== Arts and culture ==
St. Louis County Library Samuel C. Sachs Branch is in Chesterfield.

== Parks and recreation ==
Faust Park contains a playground, historical village, walking trail, carousel, and The Butterfly House, which opened in 1998. A nearby cement butterfly sculpture by Bob Cassilly was dedicated in 1999.

Recreation facilities in Chesterfield include Chesterfield Amphitheater, Chesterfield Valley Athletic Complex, and Chesterfield Family Aquatic Center.

== Education ==
=== Public schools ===
Rockwood School District serves the western portions of the city, and Parkway School District serves the east. District schools located in Chesterfield include:

- Chesterfield Elementary
- Green Trails Elementary
- Highcroft Ridge Elementary
- Kehrs Mill Elementary
- Marquette High School
- Parkway Central High School
- Parkway Central Middle
- Parkway West High School
- Parkway West Middle
- River Bend Elementary
- Shenandoah Valley Elementary
- Wild Horse Elementary

=== Private schools ===
There are three private elementary schools: Chesterfield Montessori School, Ascension School, and Incarnate Word School. The Fulton School is a PK–12 Montessori school. Barat Academy was a private high school that closed in 2025.

=== Colleges, universities, and trade schools ===
Logan University offers undergraduate and graduate level courses on Chiropractic, Pre-Chiropractic, Sport Science and Rehabilitation medicine.

== Transportation ==
=== Highways and major roads ===
Interstate 64 (locally referred to as "Highway 40") runs east–west through Chesterfield. There are seven exits serving the city (numbers 14–21). Missouri Route 340 (a.k.a., Olive Blvd.) runs on east–west through much of Chesterfield, before turning Southwest near the I-64 Interchange; its name changes to Clarkson Road south of this junction. Missouri Route 141 runs along the eastern border between Chesterfield and Town and Country. Route 141's northern terminus was, until recently, located in Chesterfield at Olive Blvd. The Missouri Department of Transportation (MoDOT) and St. Louis County Department of Highways and Traffic (DHT) began construction of Route 141 in Chesterfield in 2009. MoDOT expanded Route 141 between just south of Ladue Road (Route AB) to Olive Boulevard (Route 340). DHT extends Route 141 from Olive Road to the Page Avenue Extension (Route 364) at the Maryland Heights Expressway.

=== Public transportation ===
Public transportation is provided by Metro and connects Chesterfield to many other portions of Greater St. Louis by numerous bus routes.

=== Air ===
Spirit of St. Louis Airport is located in the Chesterfield Valley; the airport is owned by St. Louis County.

=== Rail ===
Central Midland Railway (CMR), a division of Progressive Rail Inc. of Minnesota, provides regular freight rail service to industrial customers located in the Chesterfield Valley. CMR operates the far eastern segment of the former Chicago, Rock Island and Pacific Railway's St. Louis to Kansas City main line that was constructed in 1870. The active portion of the former CRI&P line runs from the north side of St. Louis, where it connects with the Terminal Railroad Association of St. Louis and Union Pacific Railroad, and now terminates in Union, Missouri. A primary rail customer in Chesterfield is a RockTenn (formerly Smurfit Stone) corrugated packaging plant which is located on a spur track that extends from the main track northward along the east end of the runway of the Spirit of St. Louis Airport. RockTenn typically receives inbound shipments of corrugated paper.

== Notable people ==
- Michael Avenatti, convicted felon, attorney, and entrepreneur, moved to Chesterfield as a child.
- Dan Connolly, professional football player, one time Super Bowl champion, holds record for longest kick return by an offensive lineman in NFL history.
- Robbie Daymond, professional voice actor.
- Clayton Keller, professional ice hockey player who is captain for the Utah Mammoth, was born in Chesterfield.
- James Kerwin, film and theatre director, graduated from Parkway Central High School.
- Max Scherzer, professional baseball pitcher for the Toronto Blue Jays, was born in Chesterfield.
- Trista Sutter, television personality, graduated from Parkway Central High School.

== See also ==
- List of cities in Missouri
