= Seiwa-en =

Japanese strolling garden in St Louis, Missouri

Coordinates: 38.6101°N 90.2619°W

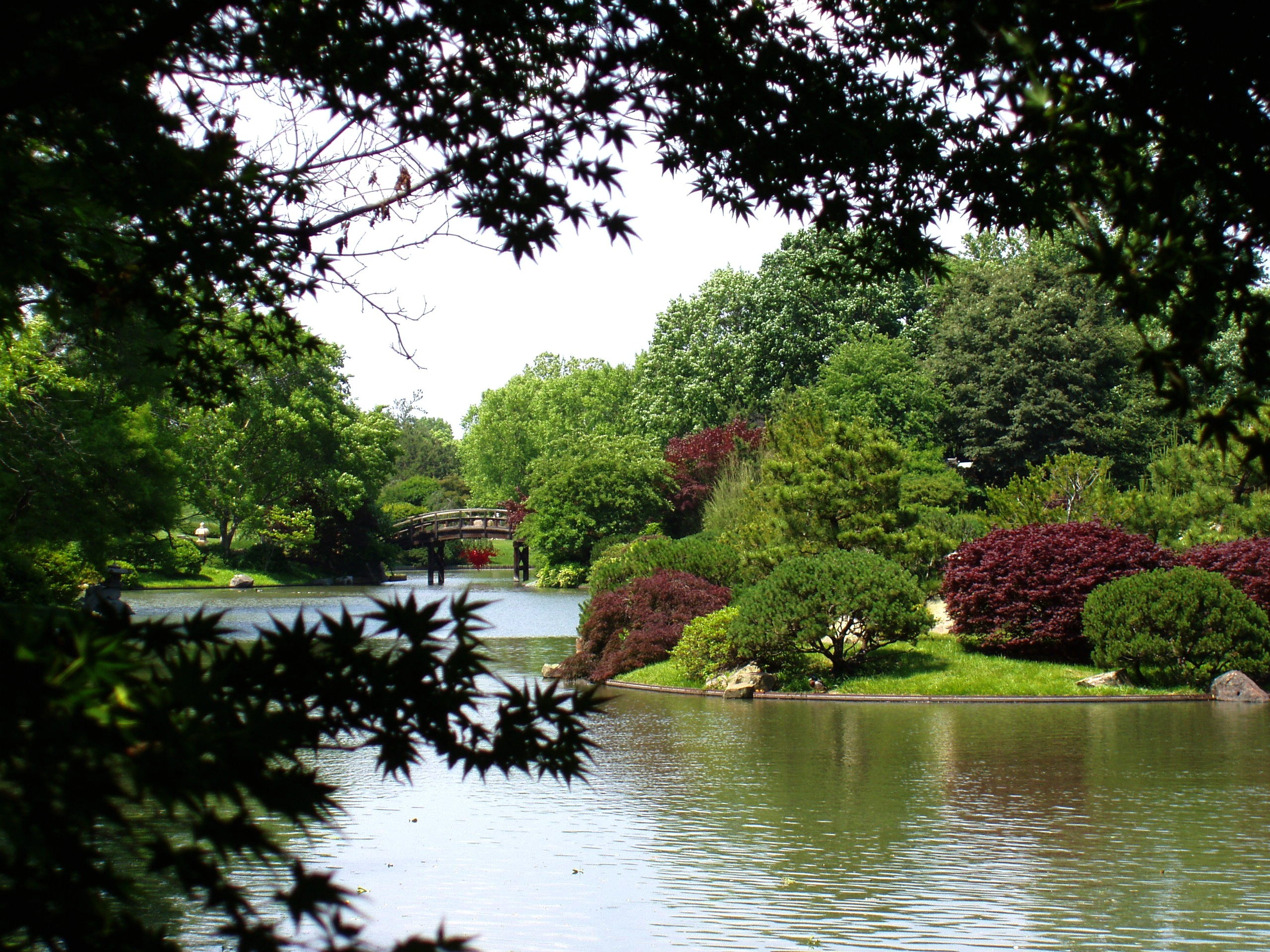
View of a bridge at the Seiwa-en garden in the Missouri Botanical Gardens

Seiwa-en is a Japanese strolling garden located in the Missouri Botanical Garden, St Louis, Missouri, in the Midwestern United States. At 5 ha (14 acres), it is the largest such garden in North America. It features a large lake, modest traditional buildings, bridges, islands, carp, dry gravel landscaping, and other symbolic features. Planning for the garden began in 1972, and it was dedicated in May 1977.

Seiwa-en was designed by Dr. Koichi Kawana, a professor of Japanese architecture and landscape design at UCLA. He was originally from Hokkaido island in northern Japan and taught ikebana, a Japanese style of flower arangment in his spare time. Dr. Kawana was a pioneer in the design of traditional Japanese gardens that integrate local or native plants into the garden's structure. He designed more than one dozen Japanese style gardens in America after becoming a US citizen in 1971; Seiwa-en is his largest work.

The garden contains a Japanese maple tree planted as a gift to the garden by the Emperor of Japan on a visit to St. Louis. There are also Japanese cherry trees planted near the garden's entrance that bloom in spring.
