= Koichi Kawana =

Japanese American garden designer, landscape architect and teacher

Koichi Kawana (Japanese: 川名孝一, born March 16, 1930, in Hokkaido – September 13, 1990) was a post-war Japanese American garden designer, landscape architect and teacher. He designed gardens in San Diego, Los Angeles, Denver, Colorado, Chicago, Illinois, Memphis, Tennessee, and St. Louis, Missouri. Some of his major works include the Seiwa-en Japanese Garden in the Missouri Botanical Garden, the Hannah Carter Japanese Garden and a dry landscape garden at Sawtelle, Los Angeles. He designed the bonsai collection for the Pavilion of Japanese Art at LACMA in the 90s.

== Biography ==
In 1930, Kawana was born in Hokkaido, Japan. He graduated from Yokohama Municipal University in 1951 and got a US citizenship in 1971. Kawana became a college professor and lecturer for 24 years at UCLA on Japanese art, environmental design, and Japanese landscape/architecture. Dr. Kawana founded his own design practice, Environmental Design Associates, a Los Angeles-based design firm in 1966. Dr. Kawana died on September 13, 1990.

Aside from lecturing at UCLA, Kawana designed gardens at several parks in the United States, mainly having a Japanese style.

== Selected works ==
- Redesign of the Hannah Carter Japanese Garden (Shikyo-en), 1969
- Seiwa-en Japanese Garden in Missouri Botanical Garden, 1977
- Sansho-En in the Chicago Botanic Garden, 1972
- Shofu-en, the Garden of Wind and Pines, at Denver Botanic Garden,1979
- Suiho-En, the Garden of Water and Fragrance, at the Donald C. Tillman Water Reclamation Plant, 1984
- Seisui-Tei at the Minnesota Landscape Arboretum, 1985
- Sand and Stone Garden at the Bloedel Reserve, 1987
- Seijaku-En at the Memphis Botanic Garden, redesigned, 1989
- Dry landscape garden in Stoner Park, Sawtelle. 1989
- Pavilion of Japanese Art bonsai collection at LACMA, 1900
