= Missouri Botanical Garden =

Botanical garden in St. Louis, Missouri, U.S.

- Interactive map of Missouri Botanical Garden
- Type: Botanical garden
- Location: St. Louis, Missouri, U.S.
- Coordinates: 38°36′45″N 90°15′35″W
- Opened: 1859
- Website: www.missouribotanicalgarden.org
- Missouri Botanical Garden
- U.S. National Register of Historic Places
- U.S. National Historic Landmark District
- Architect: Multiple
- Architectural style: Late Victorian
- NRHP reference No.: 71001065

Significant dates
- Added to NRHP: November 19, 1971
- Designated NHLD: December 8, 1976

The Missouri Botanical Garden is a botanical garden located at 4344 Shaw Boulevard in St. Louis, Missouri. It is also known informally as Shaw's Garden for founder and philanthropist Henry Shaw. Its herbarium, with more than 7.5 million specimens, is the second largest in North America, behind that of the New York Botanical Garden. Its Peter H. Raven Library contains 85% coverage of all literature ever published on systematic botany and plant taxonomy. The Index Herbariorum code assigned to the herbarium is MO and it is used when citing housed specimens.

== History ==
The Missouri Botanical Garden began development by 1850 and was created by Henry Shaw, a British immigrant who had moved to St. Louis in 1819. The garden was developed on land that previously belonged to Shaw and began construction in 1855. The garden officially opened in 1859. It has informally been referred to as Shaw's Garden since its opening. Even before opening day, Shaw's goal was to make the Garden open to the general public and botanists alike, further encouraging the growing interest in botany during the mid-nineteenth century. Shaw later died in August of 1889. In his will, he established a trust in which he granted control of the Botanical Garden to a Board of Trustees "to keep up, maintain, and establish a botanic garden, for the cultivation and propagation of plants, flowers, fruit, and forest trees, and for the dissemination of knowledge thereof."

A wealthy businessman, Shaw had amassed land in St. Louis County southwest of the main city at that time. During a trip to England in 1851 to visit the Great Exhibition, he was inspired to create a garden on the land he had acquired in Missouri.He sent plans of his garden to William Jackson Hooker, then director of the Royal Botanic Gardens, Kew, seeking guidance. Hooker directed Shaw to fellow St. Louisan George Engelmann, a gynecologist and botanist who became Shaw's mentor, assisting him in the development of his gardens.Along with sending botanical specimens and books to Shaw, Engelmann also introduced Shaw to Asa Gray, a botanist and professor at Harvard University.

"In Shaw's Garden" postcard, c.1944.

In 1885, Gray and Shaw helped establish the Shaw School of Botany at Washington University in St. Louis, and Dr. William Trelease was named the Director of the new program. After Shaw's death, Trelease was elected the new Director of the Missouri Botanical Gardens by the Trustees, where he published the first annual Missouri Botanical Garden Report as a way to keep the Trustees of the Garden, politicians, and other botanical experts updated on the Gardens.

"In Shaw's Garden" postcard, back, c. 1944.

Missouri Botanical Garden Parterre and Palm House, c.1890.

In 1959, the conservatory began construction on the Climatron. The greenhouse replaced the former Palm House, which was demolished to build it. Opening in 1960 as one of the first geodesic-domed greenhouses, the Climatron is intended to simulate the climate of a rainforest. The completion of the Climatron made it the world's first greenhouse to implement air conditioning and humidity regulation, both which create a natural atmosphere. Additionally, the Climatron was one of the earliest buildings designed with the help of a computer, which was used to account for the different dimensions of each hexagonal panel making up the dome. Inside the Climatron, you will be immersed in a tropical world filled with lush vegetation and unique orchid species. The garden was added to the National Register of Historic Places on November 19, 1971 and was designated a National Historic Landmark on December 8, 1976.

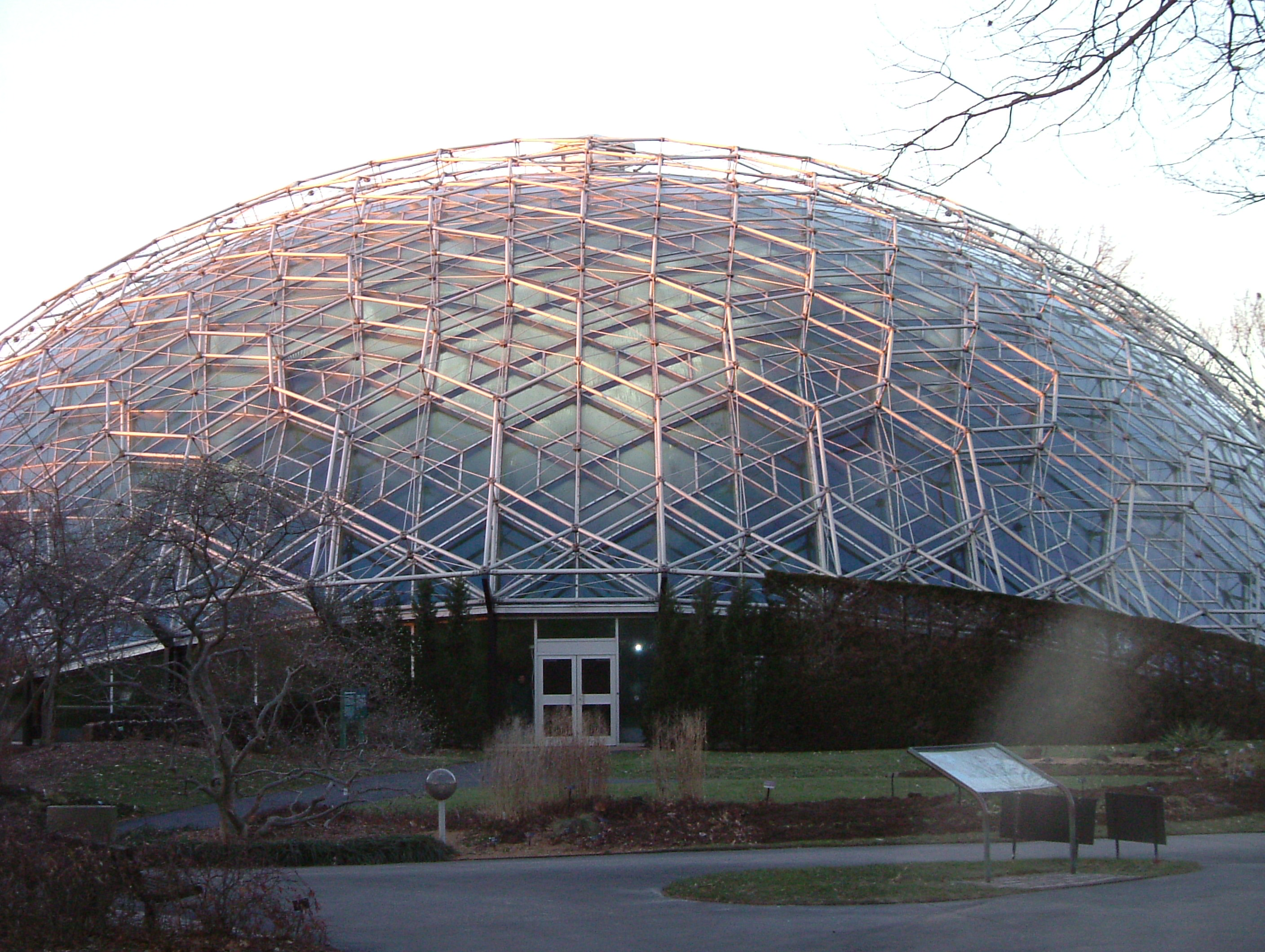
The Climatron greenhouse at the Missouri Botanical Garden simulates the climate of a rainforest for conservational and educational purposes.

In 1977, a traditional Japanese garden called Seiwa-en was established. Koichi Kawana designed the garden's landscape to be inspired by the late 19th century Japanese design chisen kaiyo. Recognized as the largest Japanese garden in the Western Hemisphere, Seiwa-en's landscape is home to a variety of bridges, hidden views, and a four-and-a-half-acre lake which contribute to its unique landscape.

On June 2, 2001, the Missouri Botanical Garden officially made the Sophia M. Sachs Butterfly House a part of their organization. The Butterfly House originally opened in 1998 at Faust Park in Chesterfield, Missouri. Although it became a division of the Missouri Botanical Garden, it remains at its original location rather than on the Garden's main grounds. The Butterfly House is home to thousands butterflies that roam freely throughout a glass conservatory. There are many tropical plants in the conservatory to simulate a natural habitat for the butterflies.

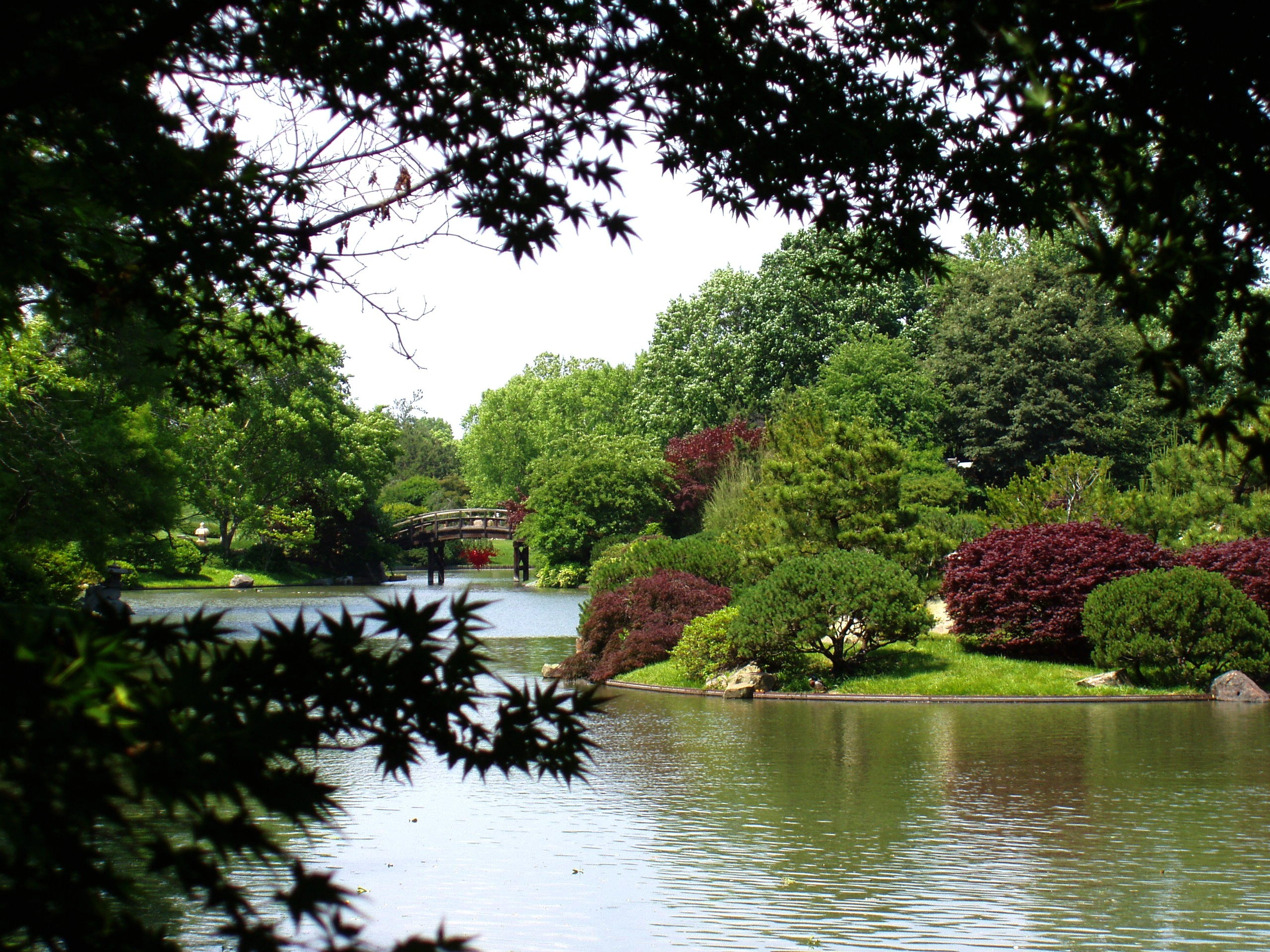
Kochi Kawana's Seiwan-en Japanese Garden

In 2024, the Tower Grove House was added to the Underground Railroad Network to Freedom. Records show that in 1855, four people enslaved by Shaw escaped the house and crossed the Mississippi River with help from Mary Meachum. A woman, Esther, and her three children were captured immediately after crossing. Shaw placed a bounty on Jim Kennerly, who had escaped.

== Peter H. Raven Library ==
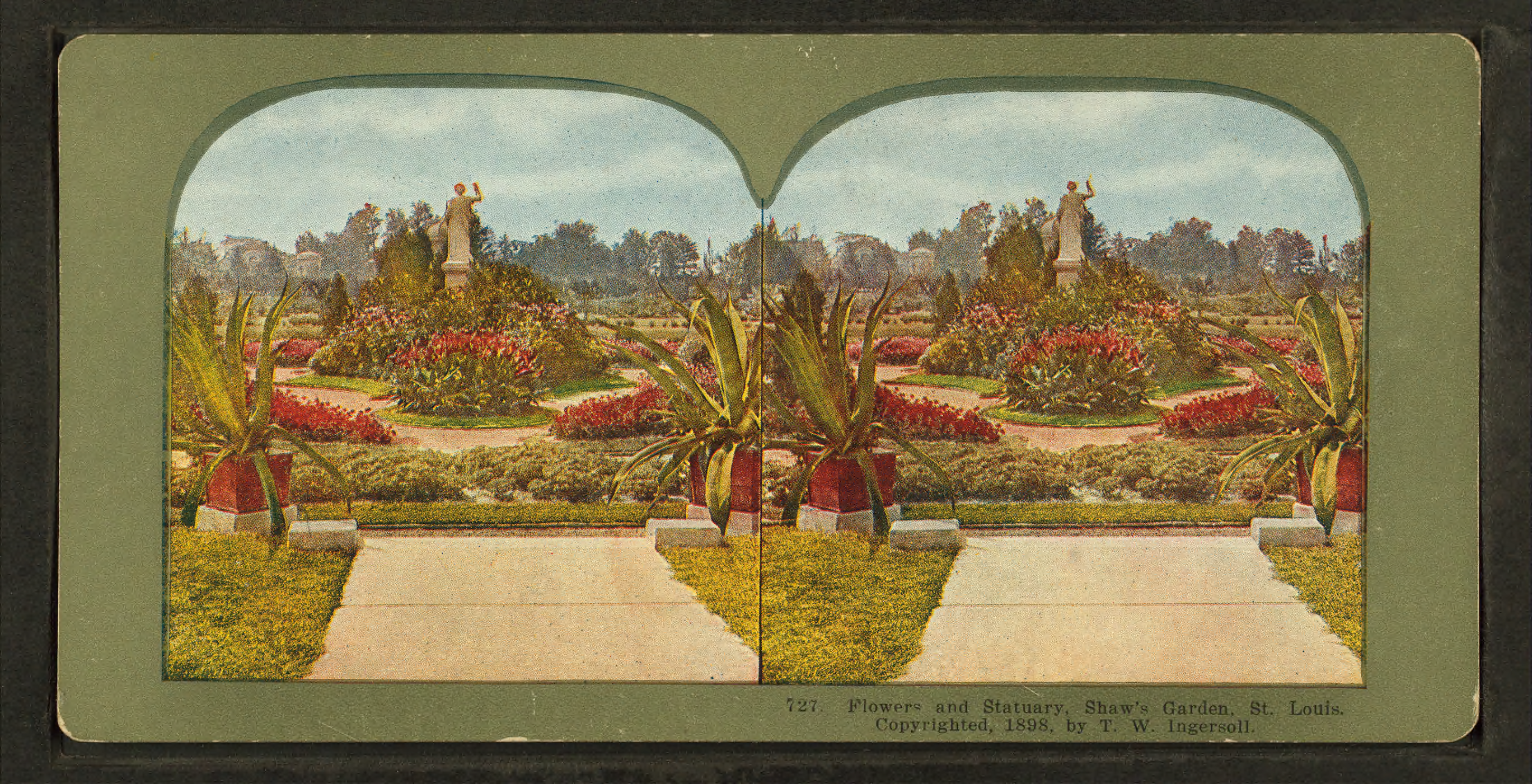
Stereoscopic view of statuary and flowers at Shaw's Garden by Truman Ward Ingersoll

Founded by Henry Shaw with the Missouri Botanical Garden in 1859, the Peter H. Raven Library general collection contains more than 160,300 items of plant taxonomic literature.

Collection	Period	Donors	Size	Ref.
Sturtevant Pre-Linnaean	1474 – 1753	Edward Lewis Sturtevant	1,000	
Linnaean		Carl Linnaeus	900	
Post-1753 Rare Book	Post-1753	Charles Darwin, George Engelmann	3,000	
Folio			1,000	
Steere		William C. Steere	3,000	

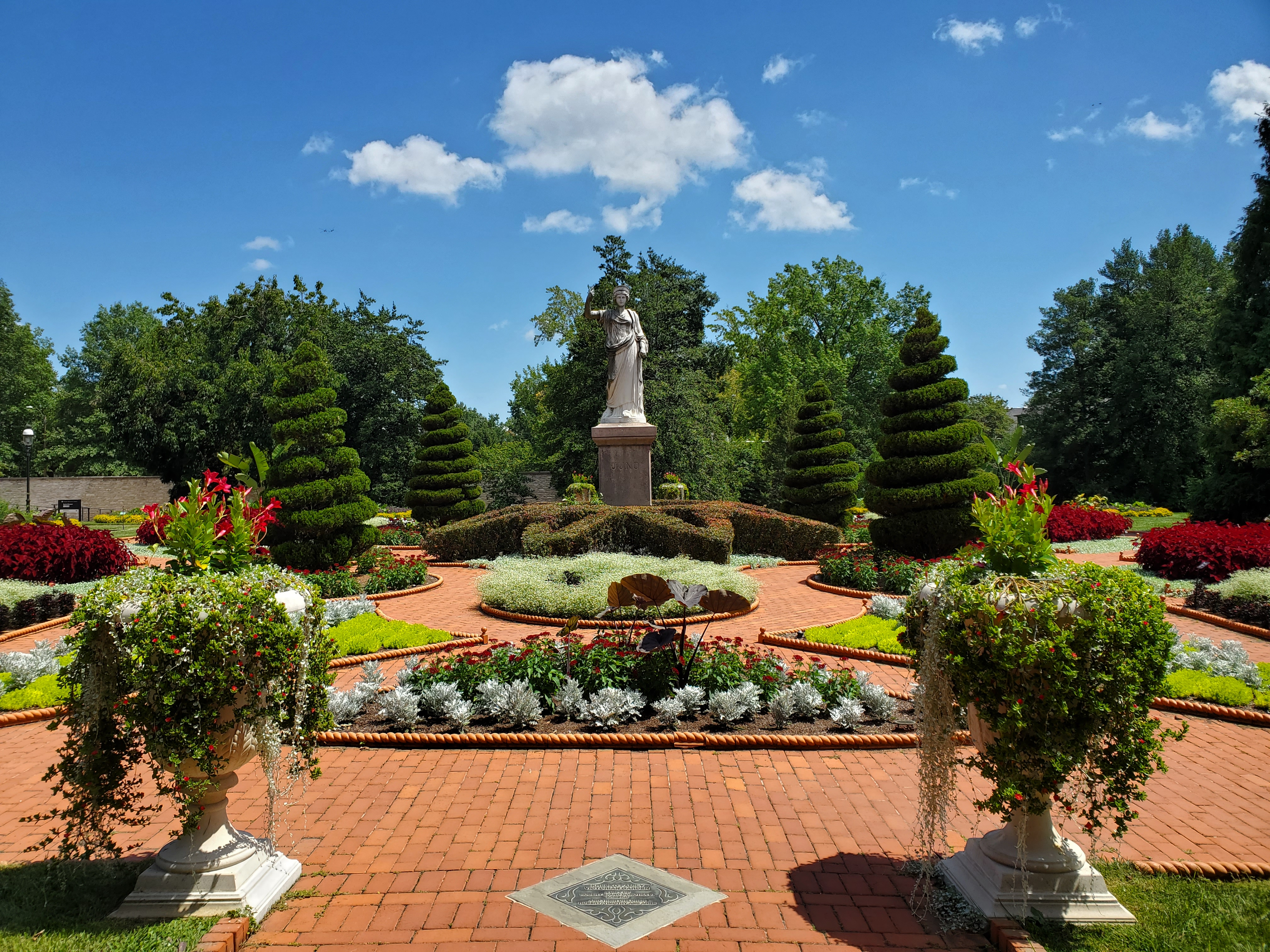
The Kresko Victorian Garden at the Missouri Botanical Garden, a highly manicured garden

== Cultural festivals ==
The garden is a place for many annual cultural festivals, such as the Japanese Festival and the Chinese Culture Days by the St. Louis Chinese Culture Days Committee. During this time, there are showcases of the culture's botanics as well as cultural arts, crafts, music and food. The Japanese Festival features sumo wrestling, taiko drumming, koma-mawashi top spinning, and kimono fashion shows. The garden is known for its bonsai growing, which can be seen all year round but is highlighted during the multiple Asian festivals.

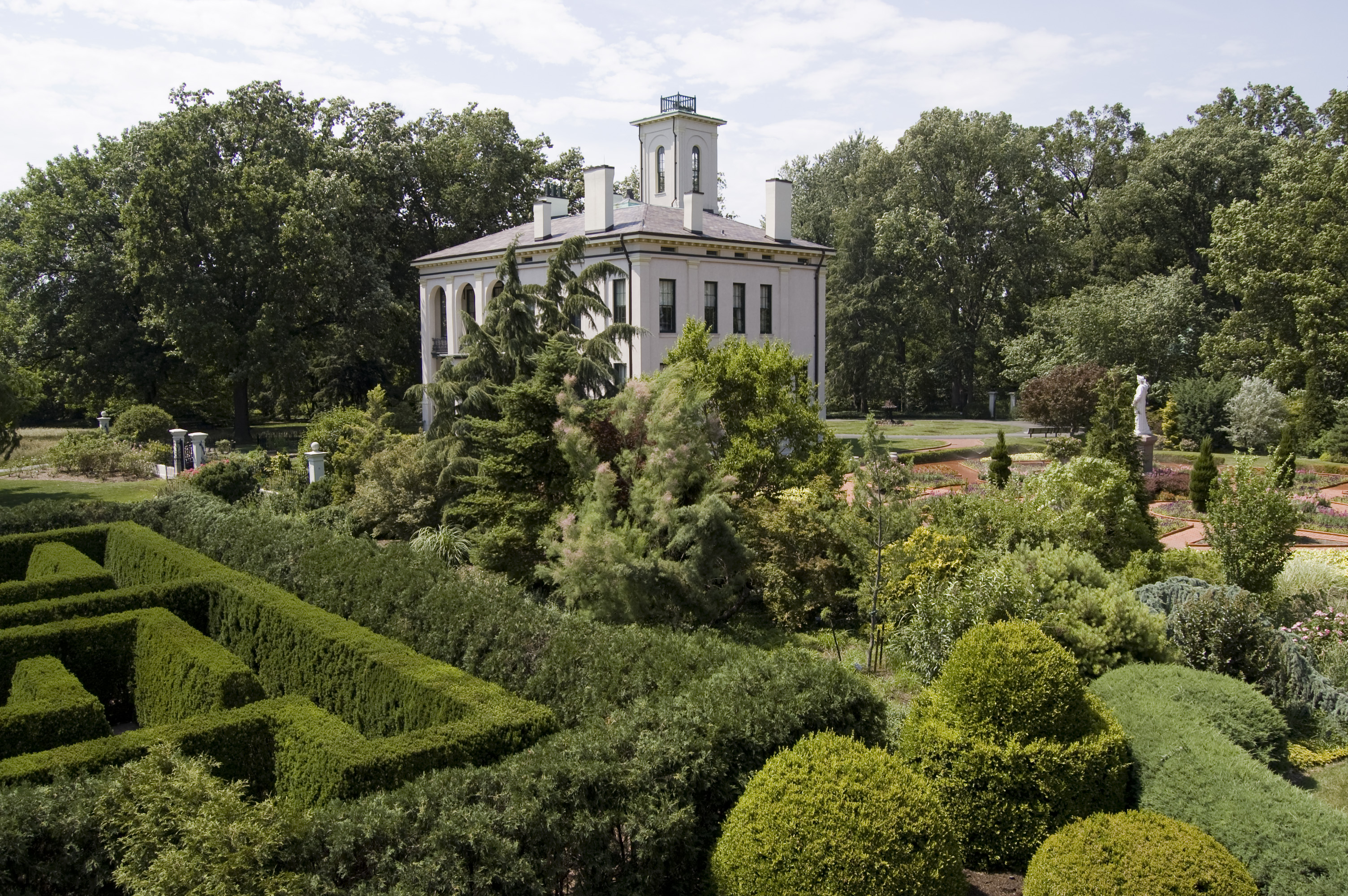
Tower Grove House, seen here behind a hedge maze

Other popular events at the garden include the Whitaker Music Festival free concert series on Wednesday nights in the summer, the annual Garden Glow light show during the holiday season, and Fest-of-Ale, a beer festival held in October.

== Gardens ==
Name	Opened	Notes	Ref.
Tower Grove House	1849	Designed by George I. Barnett in the Italianate style	
Victory of Science over Ignorance	1859	Marble statue by Carlo Nicoli, a copy of the original	
Linnean House	1882	Originally Shaw's orangery, in the late 1930s converted to house mostly camellias	
Gladney Rose Garden	1915	Circular rose garden with arbors	
Climatron and Reflecting Pools	1960	Designed by architect and engineer Thomas C. Howard; lowland rain forest with approximately 1500 plants	
English Woodland Garden	1976	Aconite, azaleas, bluebells, dogwoods, hosta, trillium, and others beneath the tree canopy	
Seiwa-en Japanese Garden	1977	Wet strolling garden with lawns and path set around a 4-acre (1.6 ha) central lake, designed by Koichi Kawana; the largest Japanese Garden in North America	
Grigg Nanjing Friendship Chinese Garden	1995	Designed by architect Yong Pan; features (gifts from sister city Nanjing) a moon gate, lotus gate, pavilion, and Chinese scholar's rocks from Lake Tai	
Blanke Boxwood Garden	1996	Walled parterre with a fine boxwood collection	
Strassenfest German Garden	2000	Flora native to Germany and Central Europe and a bust of botanist and Henry Shaw's scientific advisor George Engelmann	
Biblical garden		Date palm, pomegranate, fig and olive trees, caper, mint, citron and other plants mentioned in the Bible	

== Additional projects ==
=== EarthWays Center ===
The EarthWays Center is a group at the Missouri Botanical Garden that provides resources on and educates the public about green practices, renewable energy, energy efficiency, and other sustainability matters.

=== Shaw Nature Reserve ===
The Shaw Nature Reserve was started by the Missouri Botanical Garden in 1925 as a place to store plants away from the pollution of the city. The air in St. Louis later cleared up, and the reserve has continued to be open to the public for enjoyment, research, and education ever since. The 2,400-acre (9.7 km^{2}) reserve is located in Gray Summit, Missouri, 35 miles (56 km) away from the city.

=== The Plant List ===
The Plant List is an Internet encyclopedia project to compile a comprehensive list of botanical nomenclature, created by the Royal Botanic Gardens, Kew, and the Missouri Botanical Garden. The Plant List has 1,040,426 scientific plant names of species rank, of which 298,900 are accepted species names. In addition, the list has 620 plant families and 16,167 plant genera.

=== Living Earth Collaborative ===
In September 2017 the Missouri Botanical Garden teamed up with the St. Louis Zoo and Washington University in St. Louis in a conservation effort known as the Living Earth Collaborative. The collaborative, run by Washington University scientist Jonathan Losos, seeks to promote further understanding of the ways humans can help to preserve the varied natural environments that allow plants, animals and microbes to survive and thrive.

== Gallery ==
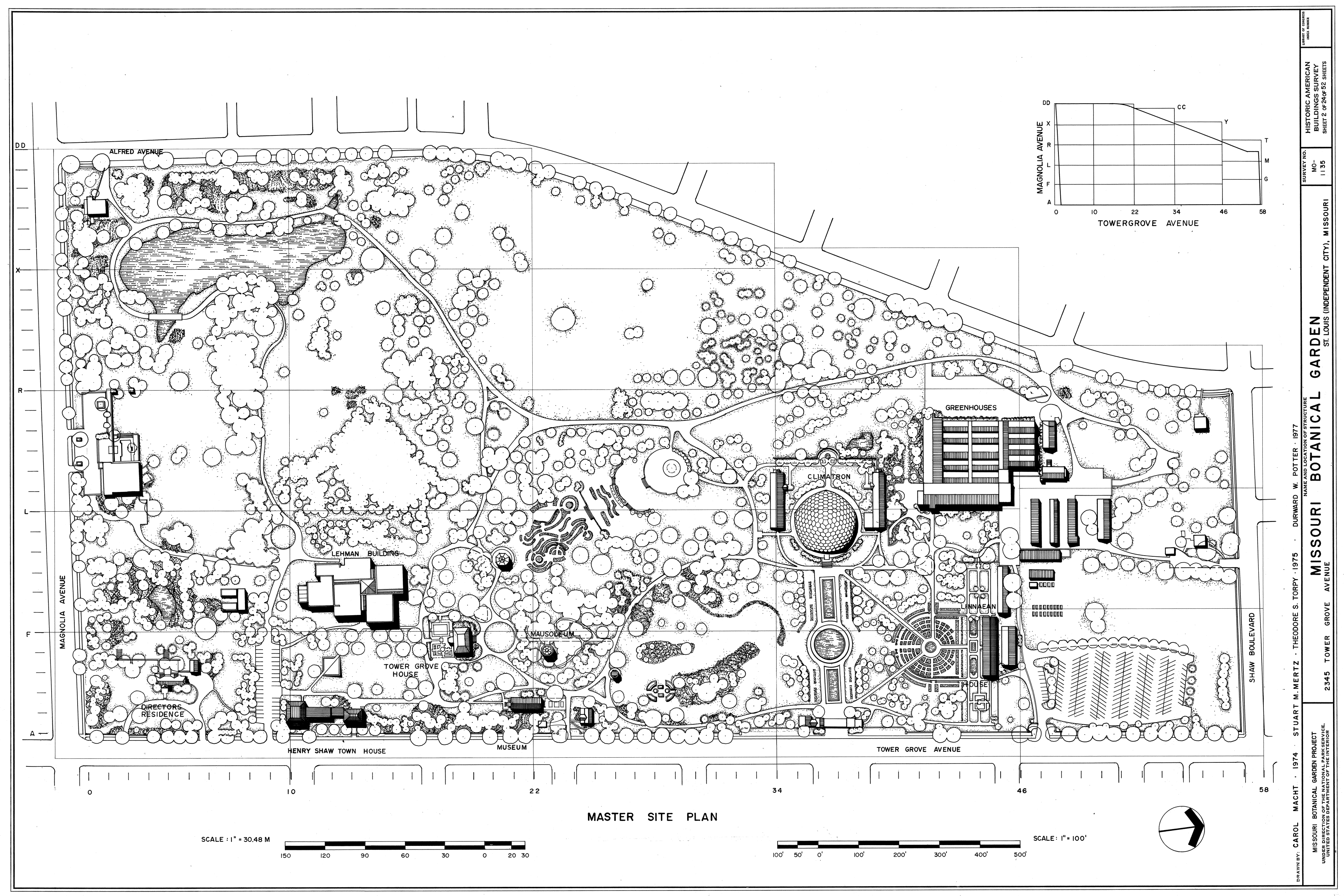
Site plan, as of 1974–1977

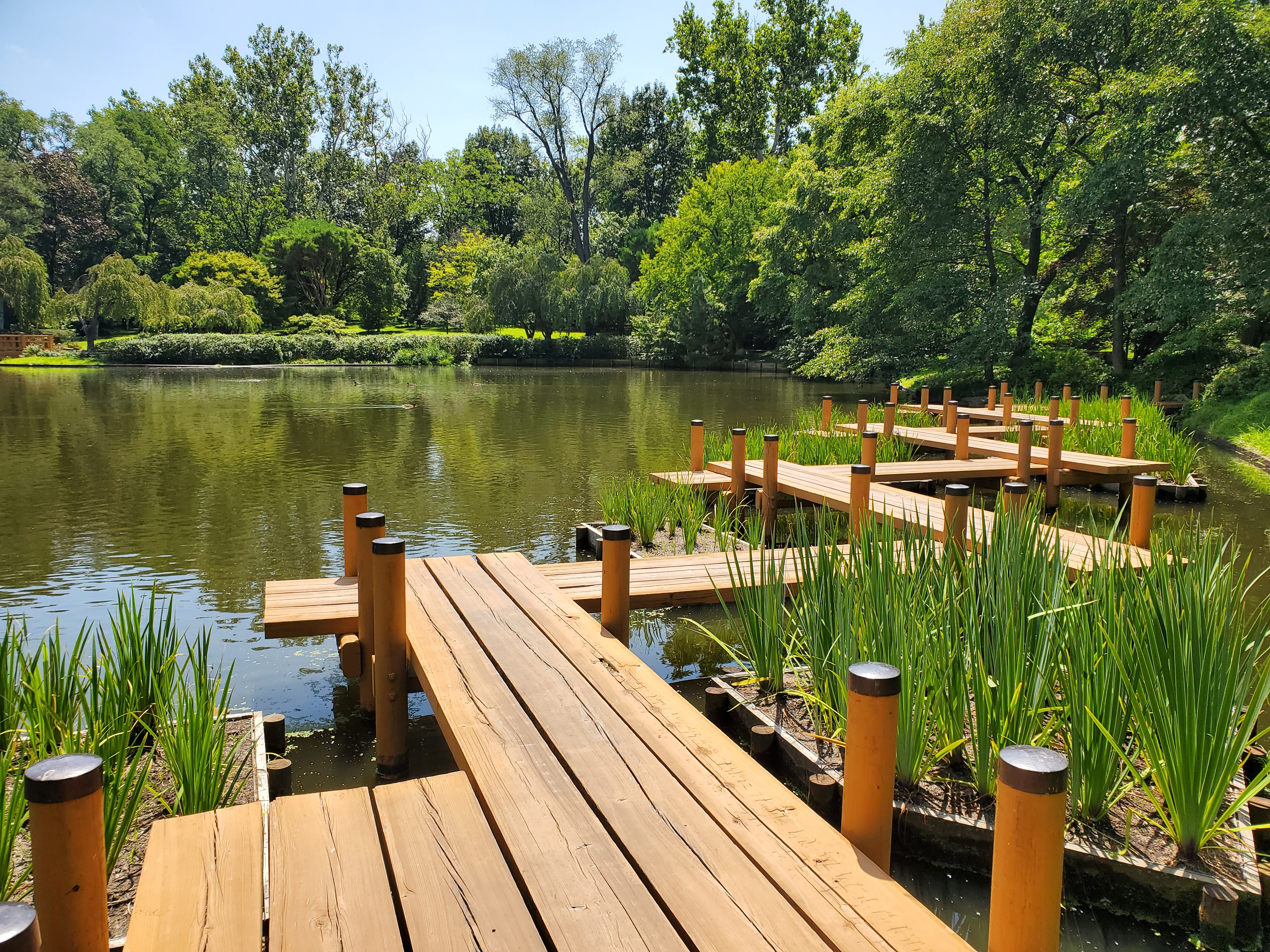
Eight Bridges (yatsu-hashi) design in the Seiwa-en

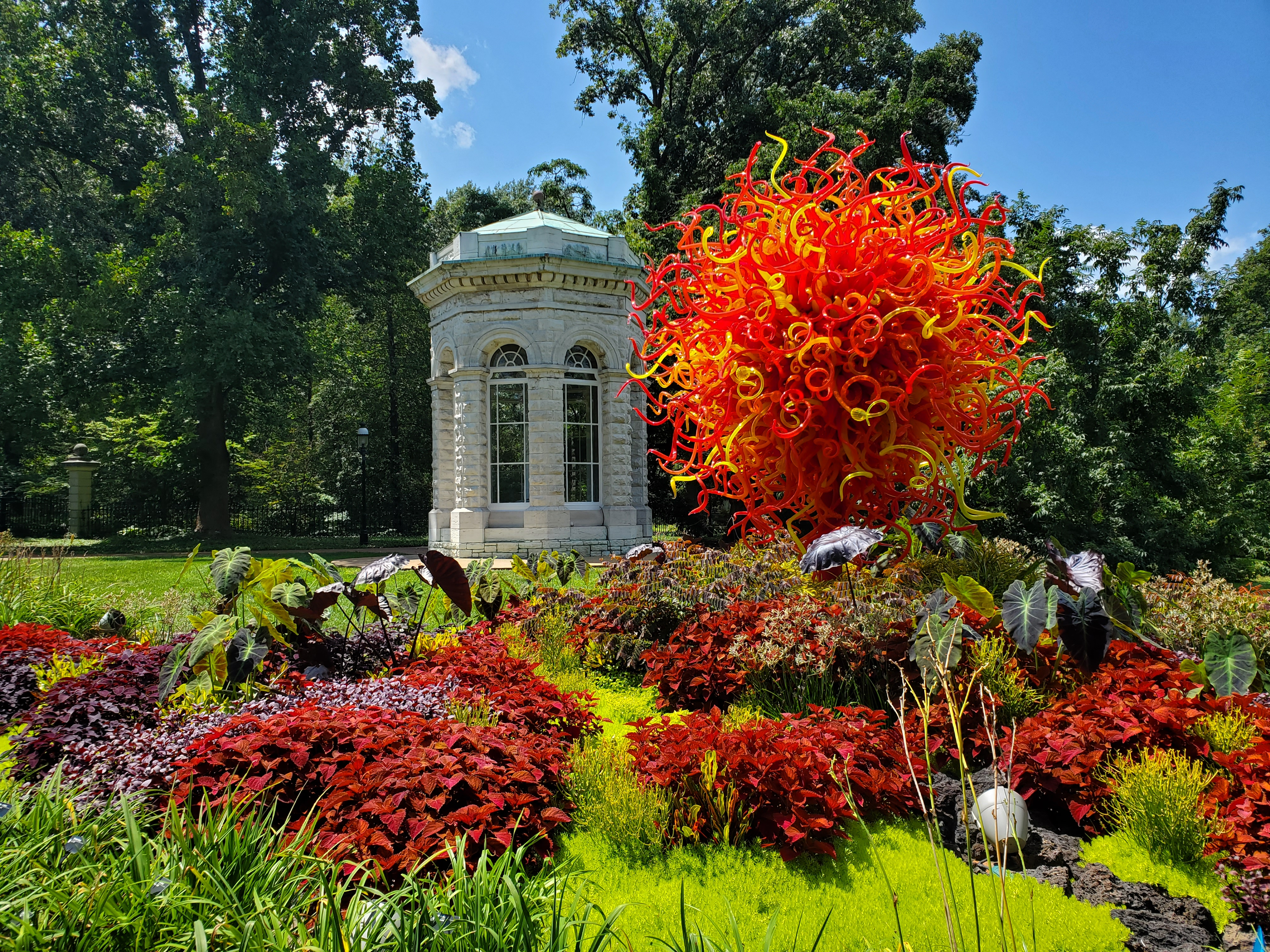
Henry Shaw's mausoleum at the Missouri Botanical Garden, with a glass art piece by Dale Chihuly in front of it as of 2023

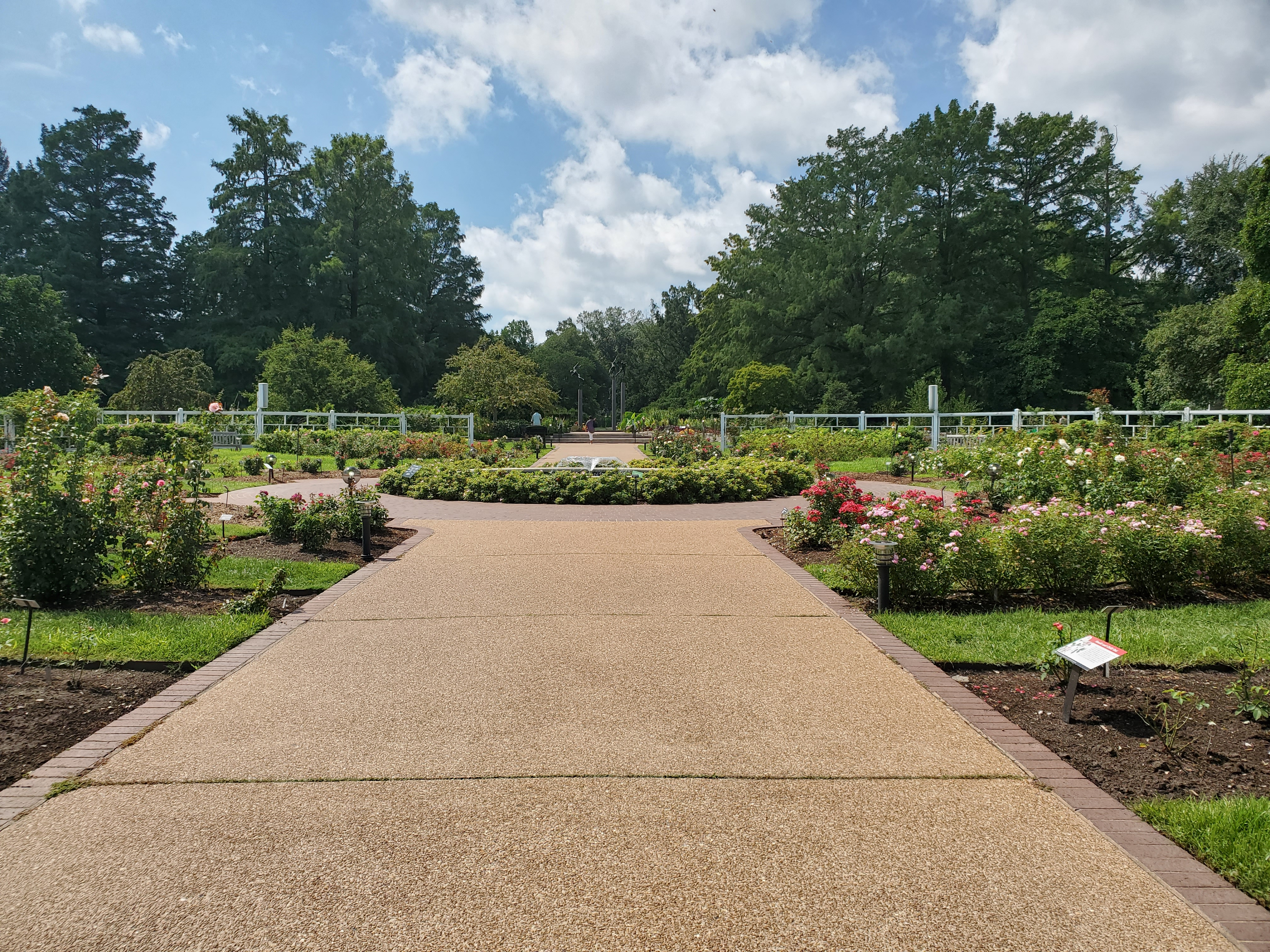
Gladney Rose Garden in 2023

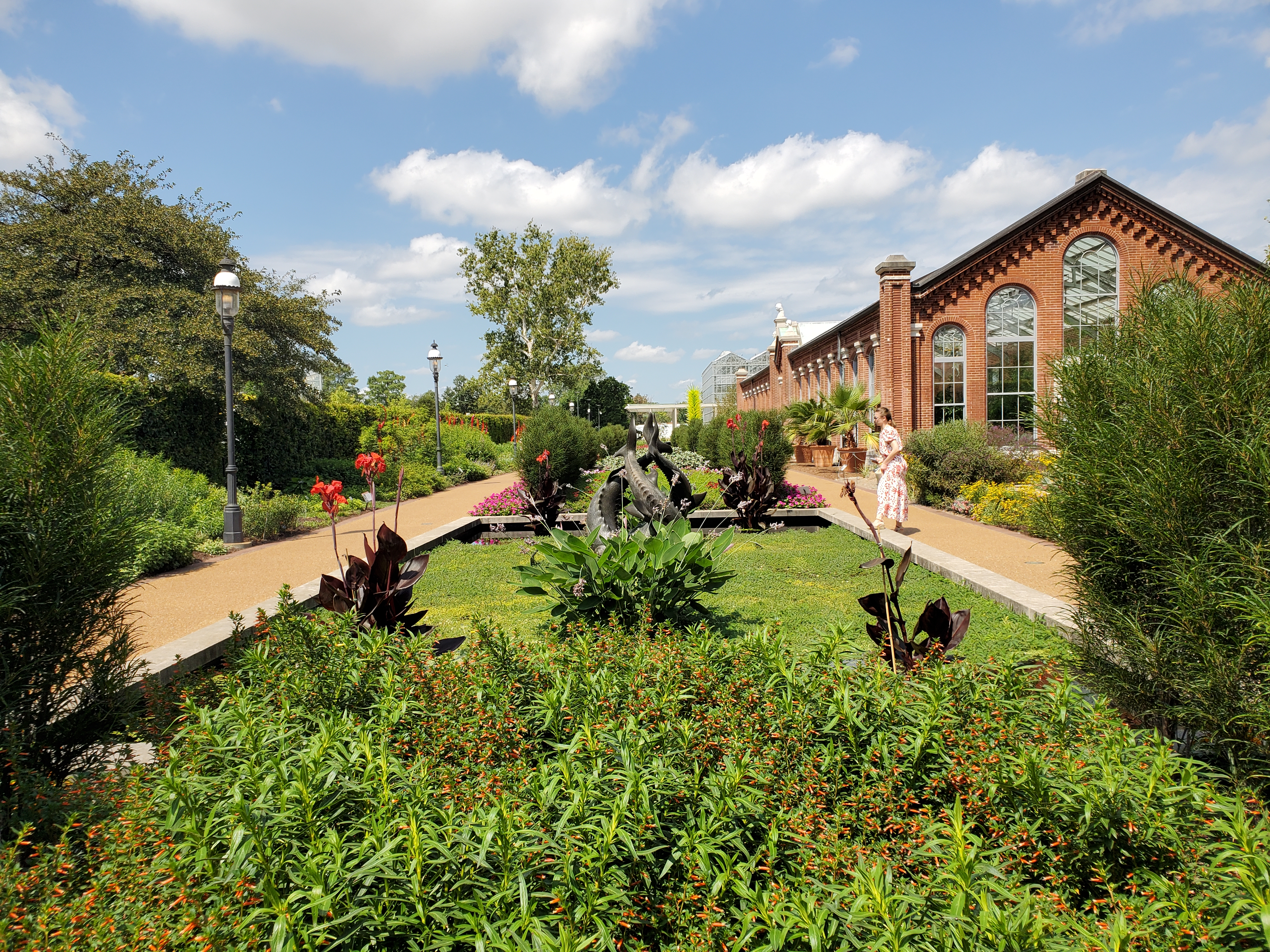
Swift Family Garden in 2023. The Linnean House is at the right.

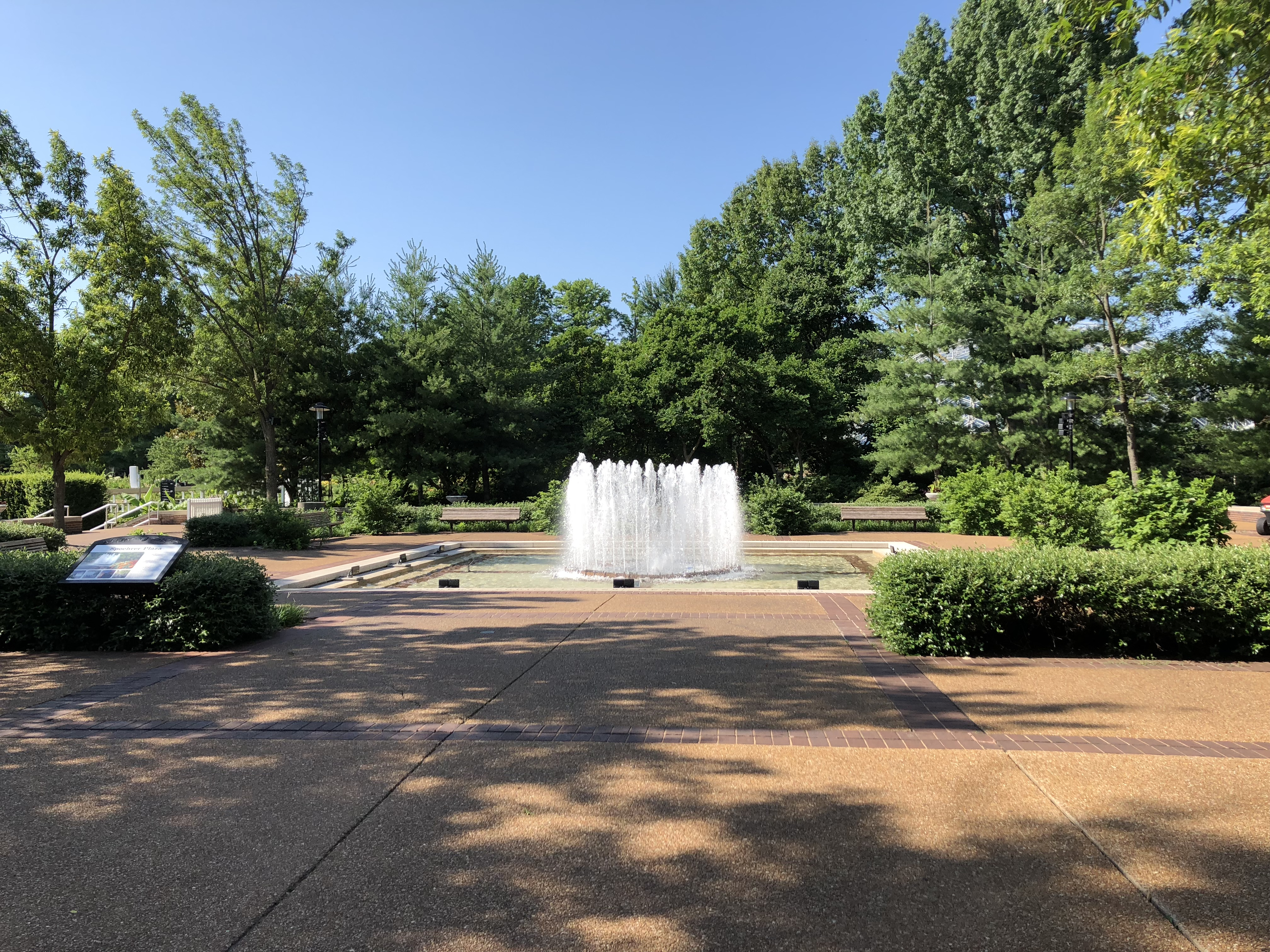
Fountain in the garden

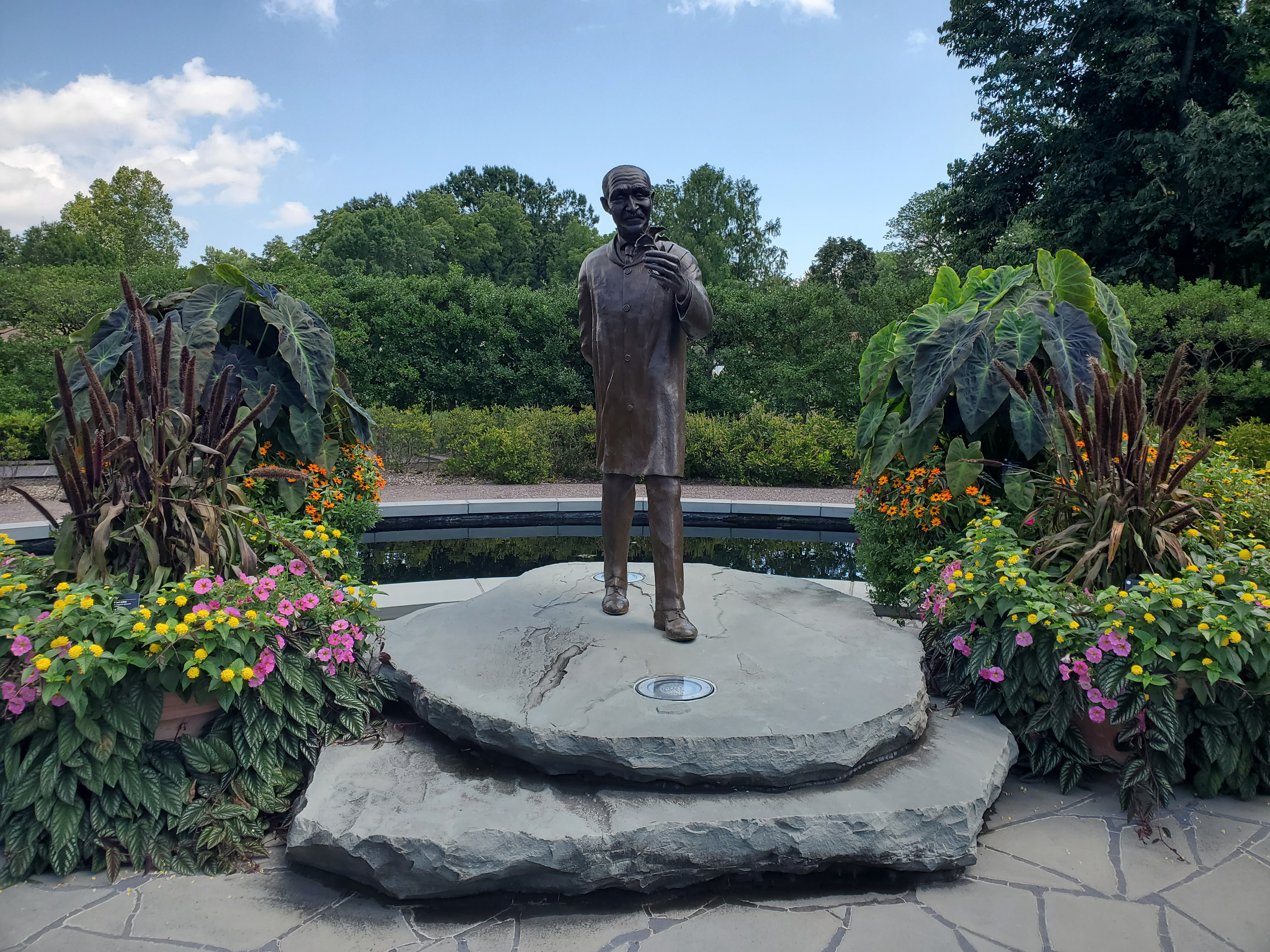
Statue of George Washington Carver

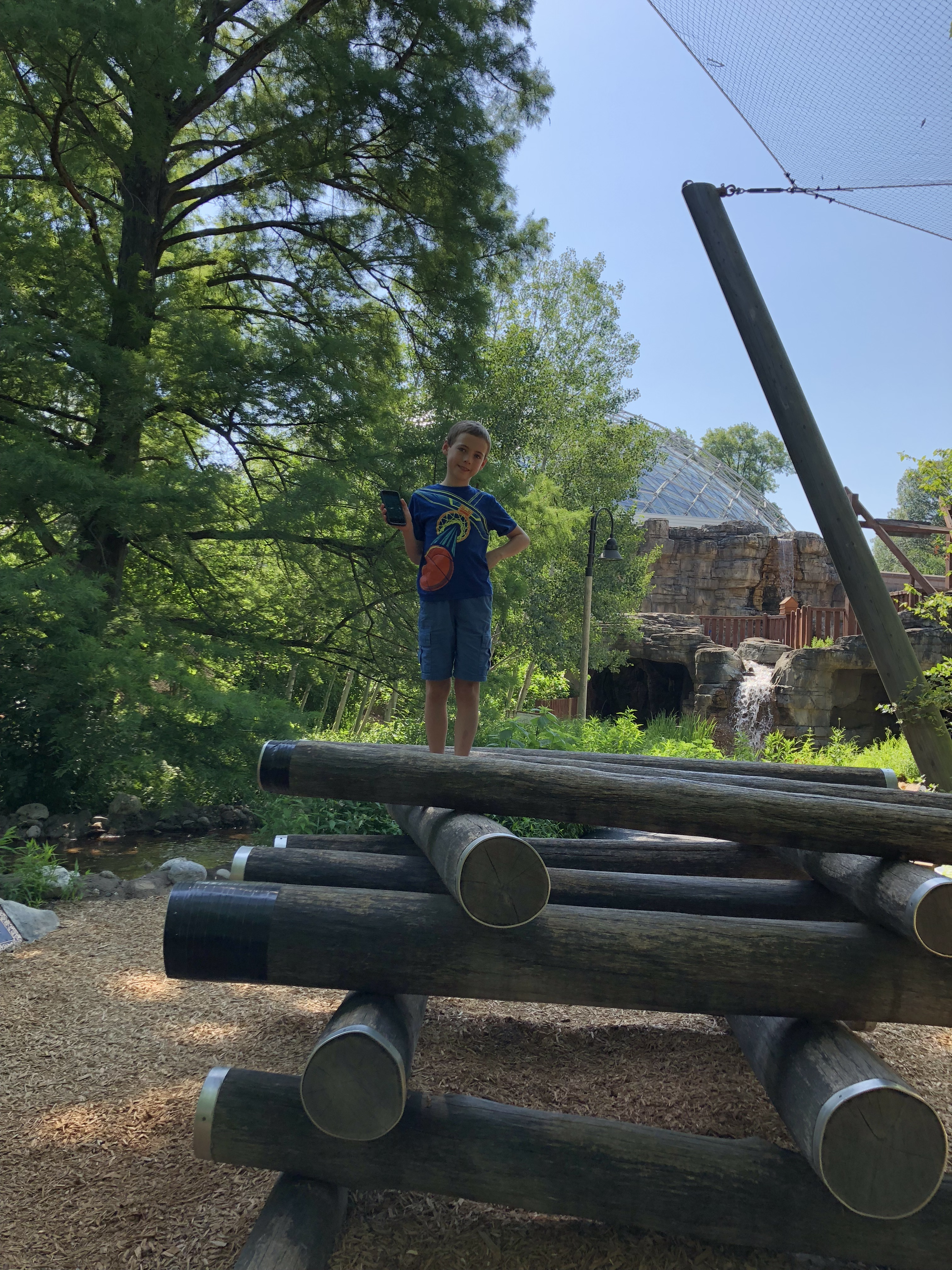
Part of the children's area

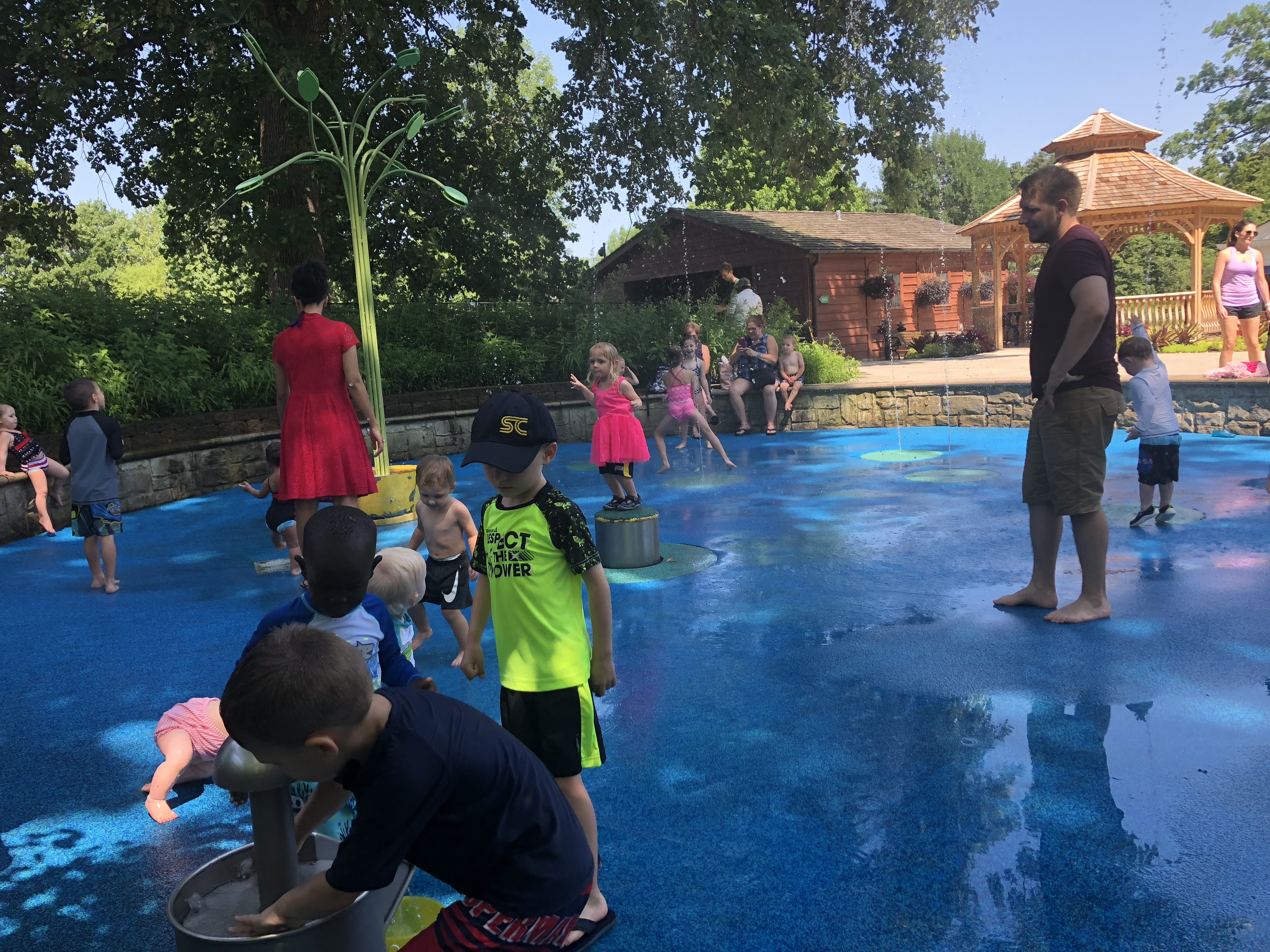
Part of the children's water-play area

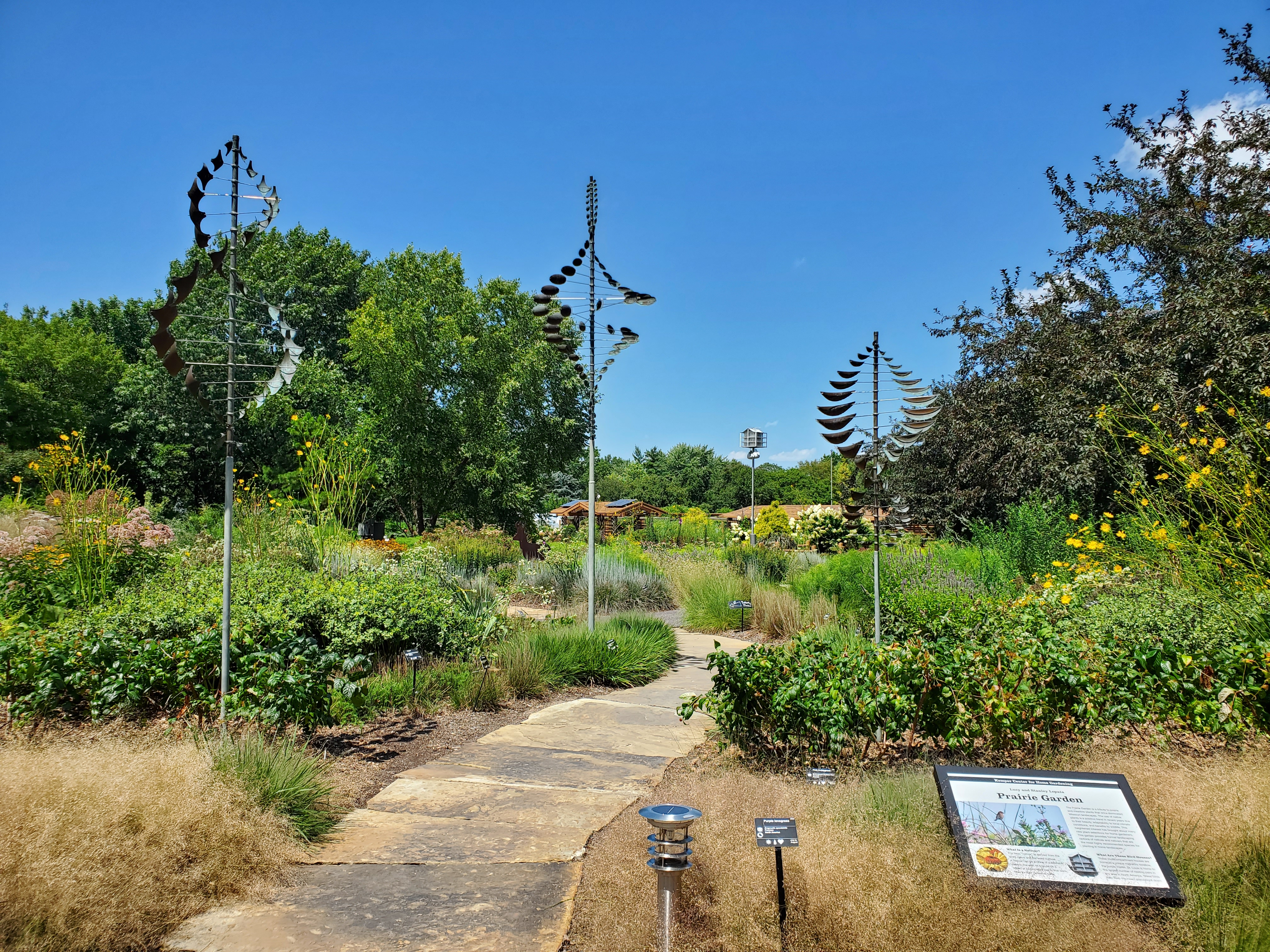
The Missouri Botanical Garden's Prairie Garden in 2023. It includes stone paths and metal animal silhouettes.

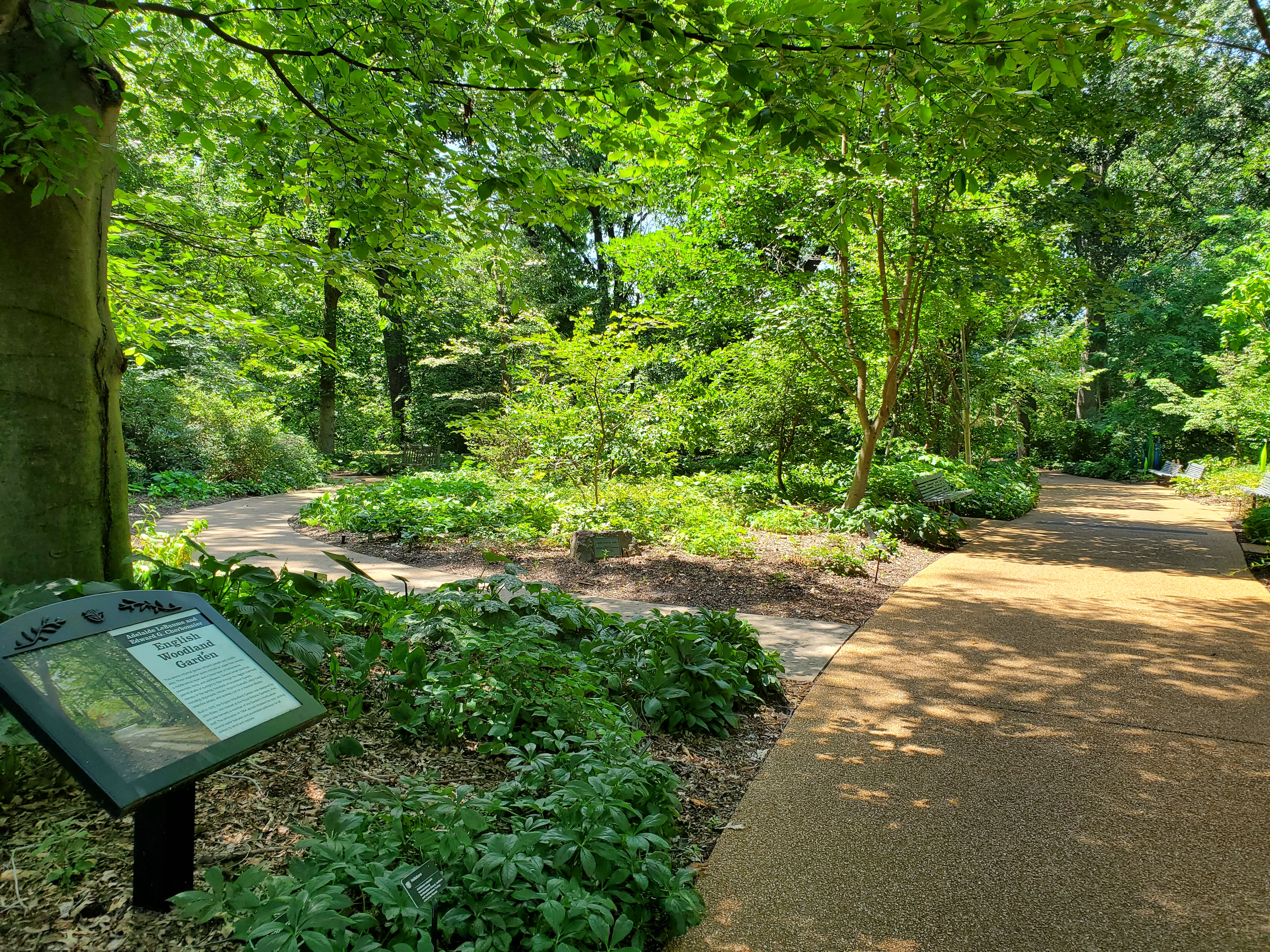
English Woodland Garden in 2023

== Henry Shaw Medal ==
The Henry Shaw Medal has been awarded since 1893. It honors those who have made a significant contribution to the Missouri Botanical Garden, botanical research, horticulture, conservation, or the museum community.

Recipients:

- 1893 J. Dorner & Son
- 1897 Luther Armstrong
- 1899 Henry Clinkaberry
- 1904 Three medals given to World’s Fair participants
- 1907 W. A. Manda
- 1935 Jeremiah Coleman
- 1978 Roberto Incer Barquero
- 1979 Julian Steyermark
- 1980 Anne L. Lehmann
- 1981 B. A. Krukoff
- 1982 Paul Kohl and S. Dillon Ripley
- 1983 Robert Hyland
- 1984 Robert Brookings Smith
- 1985 Marlin and Carol Perkins
- 1986 William L. Brown
- 1987 Koichi Kawana
- 1988 Ghillean Tolmie Prance
- 1989 Joseph H. Bascom, John H. Biggs, David M. Gates, Henry Hitchcock, Robert Brookings Smith, Tom K. Smith, Jr., C. C. Johnson Spink, Frits W. Went, Harry E. Wuertenbaecher, Jr., and Frans Stafleu
- 1990 William D. Ruckelshaus
- 1991 José Sarukhán Kermez
- 1992 Compton James Tucker
- 1993 Robert E. Kresko, Armen L. Takhtajan, O. Sage Wightman III, and Edward O. Wilson
- 1994 Joseph and Nesta Ewan
- 1995 Marlina Curry, E. Desmond, and Mary Ann Lee
- 1996 Peter H. Raven and John K. Wallace, Jr.
- 1997 William McKibben
- 1998 John Browne, William H. T. Bush, Sydney M. Shoenberg, Jr., and M. S. Swaminathan
- 1999 Liz Claiborne, Art Ortenberg, and Margaret B. Grigg
- 2000 Rachel Lambert Mellon and David W. Kemper
- 2001 Calestous Juma
- 2002 William Conway and Lucianna Gladney Ross
- 2003 Dr. William H. Danforth and Stephen F. Brauer
- 2004 Her Grace the Duchess of Devonshire and Jack E. Thomas, Jr.
- 2005 National Geographic Society
- 2006 Jack Dangermond, Geoffrey L. Rausch, and Scott C. Schnuck
- 2007 Jack Jennings and Evelyn E. Newman
- 2008 Thomas Lovejoy
- 2009 Michael A. Dirr and Nicholas L. Reding
- 2010 The Honorable Christopher S. Bond
- 2011 Her Royal Highness Princess Basma bint Ali
- 2012 Arnold W. Donald
- 2013 David Bramwell
- 2014 W. Stephen Maritz
- 2017 Lelia J. Farr
- 2020 Viscount Phillippe de Spoelberch
- 2022 David M. Hollo
- 2023 Stephen Blackmore
- 2024 Peter Wyse Jackson
- 2025 Rhett Ayers Butler and Michael K. Stern

== Publications ==
- Annals of the Missouri Botanical Garden
- Novon: A Journal for Botanical Nomenclature

== See also ==
- List of botanical gardens and arboretums in the United States
- Peter F. Stevens, a biologist working in the Missouri Botanical Garden
- List of National Historic Landmarks in Missouri
- National Register of Historic Places listings in St. Louis south and west of downtown
