= Faust Park =

Park in Chesterfield, Missouri

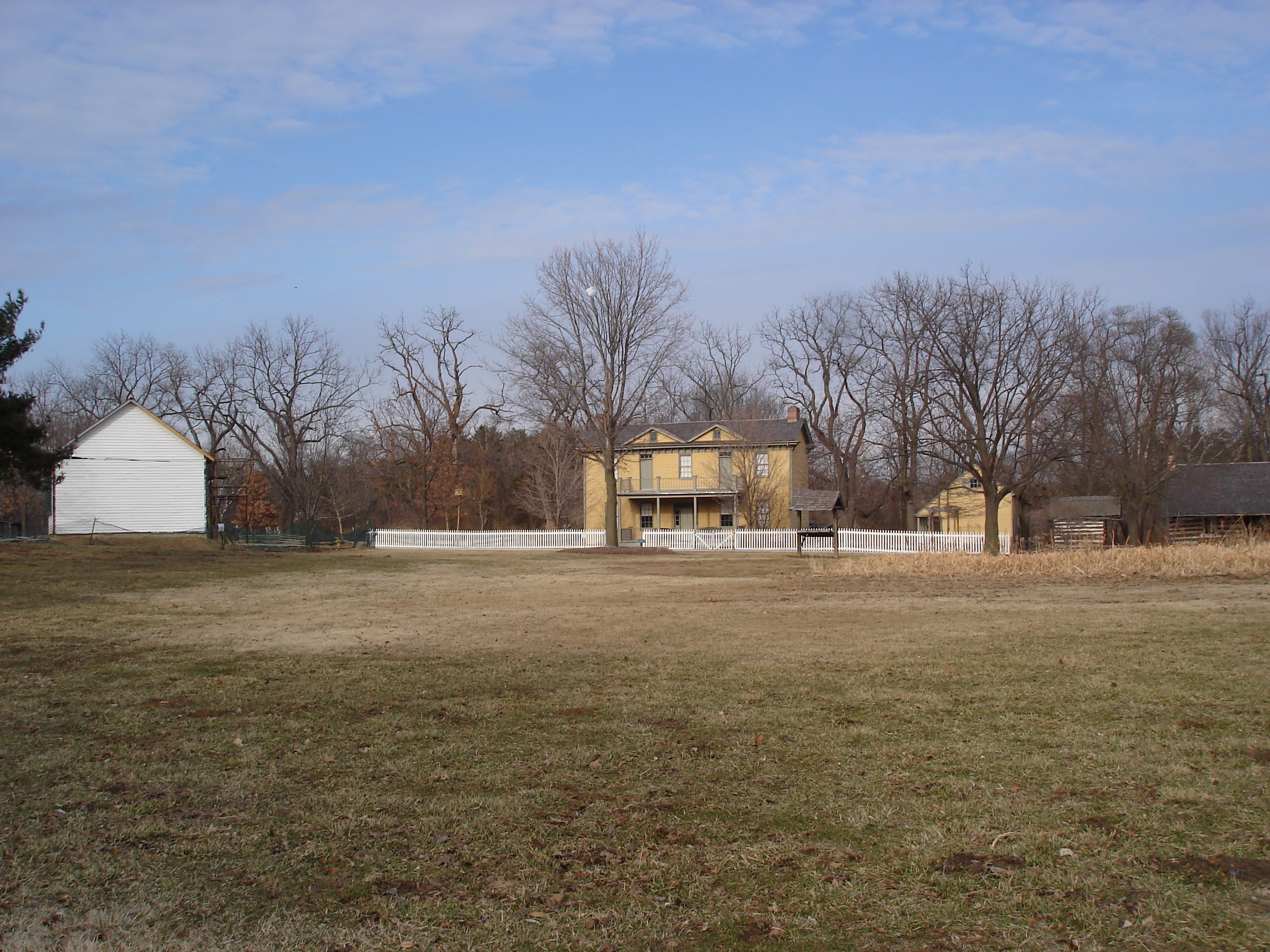
- Interactive map of Faust Park
- Type: Suburban Park
- Location: Chesterfield, MO
- Coordinates: 38.670°N 90.542°W
- Area: 200 acres (81 ha)
- Created: 1968
- Operator: St. Louis County Parks and Recreation
- Status: Open all year (open 8 am to 30 minutes after sunset)
- Public transit: MetroBus

Faust Park is a 200-acre public park in Chesterfield, Missouri.

== History ==
The land that would one day become Faust Park was originally owned by Frederick Bates, the second Governor of Missouri. In 1819, Bates built an estate on the land called Thornhill. The Thornhill Estate was added to the National Register of Historic Places in 1974. In 1968, Leicester Busch Faust acquired 100 acres of land and opened it to the public as a park. By 1995, the park had expanded to be nearly double its original size. Several attractions have since been erected in the park - such as the St. Louis Carousel, a Carousel built in the 1920s from an amusement park in Forest Park. After St. Louis Highlands (an amusement park in Forest Park) burned to the ground in 1963, several workers saved what was left and many of the items were brought for display in Faust Park.

In 1998, The Butterfly House was opened to the public. The Butterfly House is operated by Missouri Botanical Gardens.

== Attractions ==
Faust Park's Thornhill Estate remains one of the oldest structures in Missouri and has regularly scheduled tours. The Thornhill Estate is a small replica village depicting the life of people in the area in the 1800s. Faust Park gives interactive tours of the Thornhill Estate which allows visitors to participate in a variety of household chores done by homesteaders of the time.

Faust Park also plays host to various festivals such as concerts, food truck fests, and Halloween Hayrides.

== Amenities ==
The park has a 1.3 mile trail called "Governor Bates Trail". In addition to several other walking trails, the park boasts several pavilions, a playground, a lake, picnic sites, bathrooms, and other historical sites

== See also ==
- Parks in Greater St. Louis
- Frederick Bates (politician)
