= Butterfly House, Missouri Botanical Garden =

Butterfly zoo in Missouri

Sophia M. Sachs Butterfly House, Missouri Botanical Garden
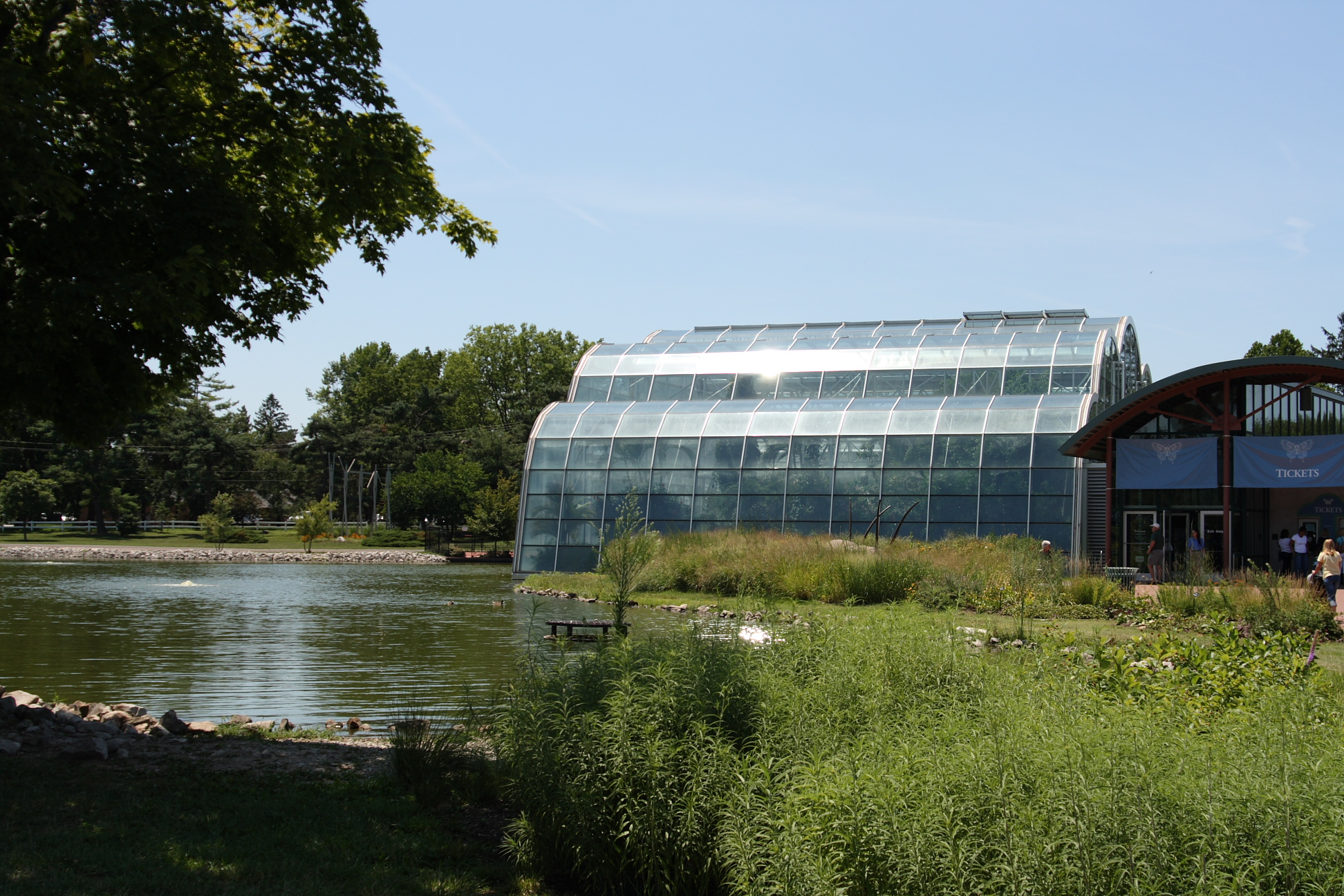
- Exterior view of Sophia M. Sachs Butterfly House, Missouri Botanical Garden, July 2007
- Interactive map of Sophia M. Sachs Butterfly House, Missouri Botanical Garden
- 38°39′53″N 90°32′34″W
- Date opened: September 18, 1998
- Location: Chesterfield, Missouri, Missouri
- No. of animals: 2000
- No. of species: 80
- Memberships: AZA
- Public transit: MetroBus
- Website: www.butterflyhouse.org

The Sophia M. Sachs Butterfly House is a butterfly zoo operated by the Missouri Botanical Gardens, and located in Faust Park in Chesterfield, Missouri, United States.

The Butterfly House is accredited by the Association of Zoos and Aquariums (AZA).

== History ==
Ground was broken for the Butterfly House in June 1997, and the Butterfly House opened its doors to the public on September 18, 1998. In 2000 the outdoor area known as the Butterfly Garden was dedicated.

In July, 2001, the Butterfly House became a division of the Missouri Botanical Garden.

In 2002, the "Emerson Lakeside Terrace" was opened. This plaza area is the site for many special events, both public and private. The Butterfly House also started participating with the Butterfly Conservation Initiative (BFCI) of the Association of Zoos and Aquariums

In 2003, the Butterfly House was accredited by the AZA, becoming the only dedicated insect facility in this organization.

In 2007, the historic Faust Family greenhouse structure was renovated, and started supplying much of the food needs for the animals. The facility was also recognized by El Bosque Nuevo as having purchased enough pupae from this sustainable butterfly farm for it to purchase an additional 16 acres (6.5 ha) of land.

== Exhibits and facilities ==
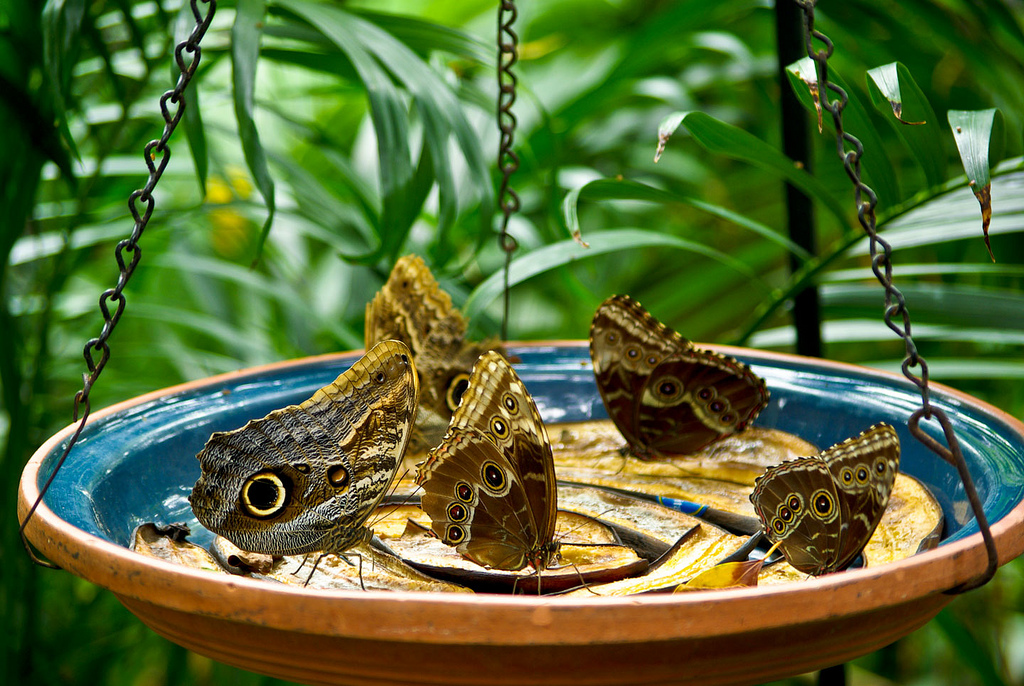
Butterflies feeding

The main hallway contains several smaller exhibits, including Small Wonders, which focuses on habitats and lifestyles of invertebrates and arachnids, Butterflies of the World, which focuses on butterfly diversity, a children's video called Butterflies, and Aquatic Invertebrates.

The Emerson Family Theater shows "The Butterfly Effect", a 17-minute introduction to butterfly behaviors and anatomy, twice each hour, and the Lopata Learning Lab provides formal classroom space for the educational activities of the Butterfly House.

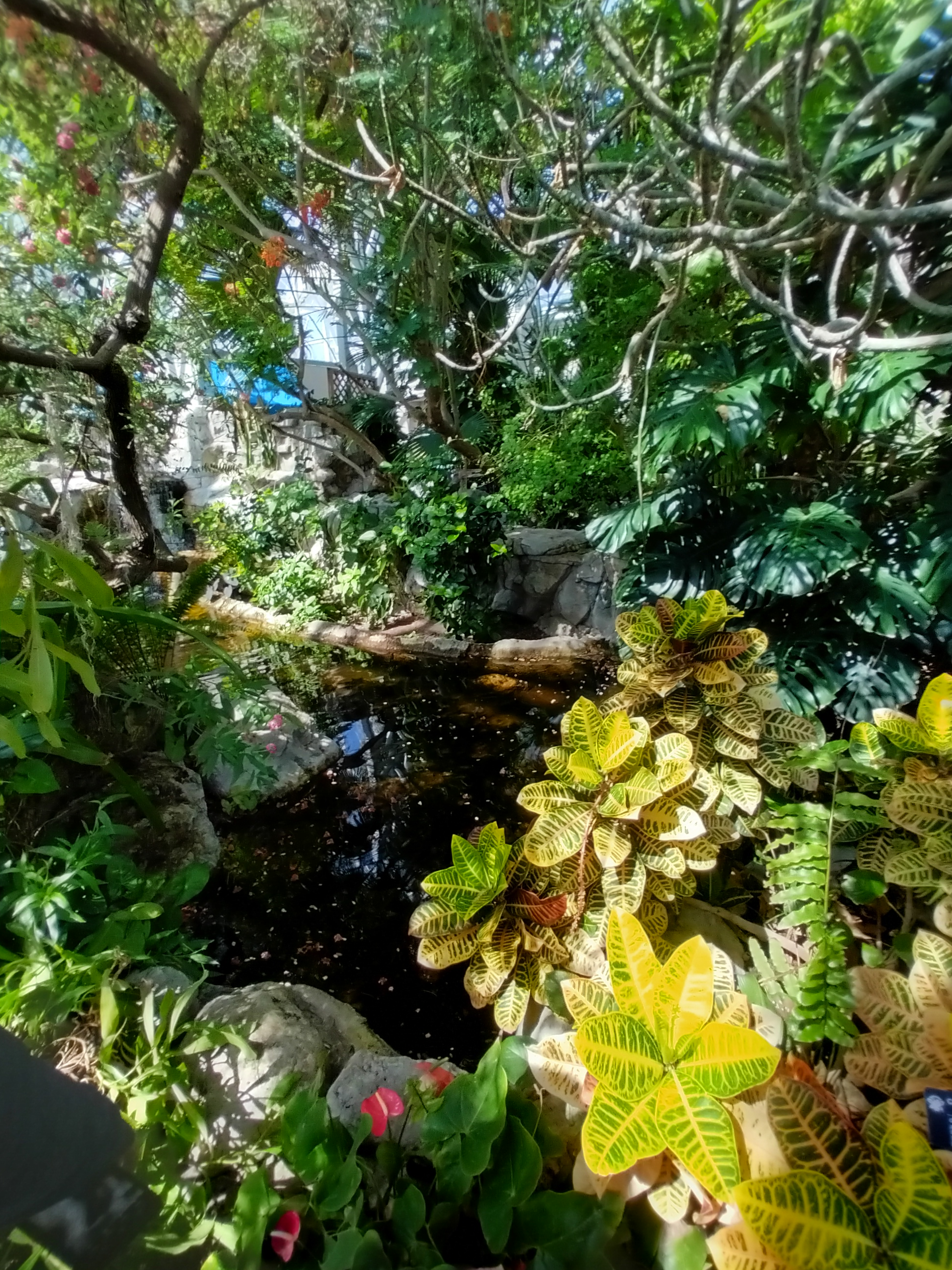
Interior of the butterfly zoo

The Conservatory Garden is an 8,000 square feet (740 m^{2}) glasses-in indoor habitat for butterflies. It consists of 5 vaults, the tallest of which is 36 feet (11 m) high at its apex to minimize visual (and flight) obstruction. This carefully controlled tropical environment houses as many as 80 butterfly species and 150 tropical plant species. In the "Miracle of Metamorphosis", hundreds of chrysalides from around the world are on display for visitors to watch the process of metamorphosis.

Outdoors overlooking a reflecting pond is the Emerson Lakeside Terrace, a multi-use area available for rent that can host weddings, receptions, corporate dinners, and other large gatherings. Next to this is the Butterfly Garden, a demonstration garden where plants were carefully selected to serve as hosts for caterpillars and nectar sources for butterflies, as well as habitat for other animals in the adjacent Faust Park. This garden includes an outdoor classroom pavilion.
