= Caulks Creek =

Stream in the American state of Missouri

Coordinates: 38.6639416°N 90.5923458°W

Caulks Creek is a stream in western St. Louis County in the U.S. state of Missouri. It is a tributary of Bonhomme Creek. Fish found in the stream include Bigmouth Buffalo, Bowfin, Walleye, Blue Catfish, and Largemouth Bass.

Caulks Creek is named after the Caulk family.

Caulks Creek

== See also ==
- List of rivers of Missouri
