= Maryland Heights Township, St. Louis County, Missouri =

Township in St. Louis County, Missouri, U.S.

Coordinates: 38°42′N 90°30′W

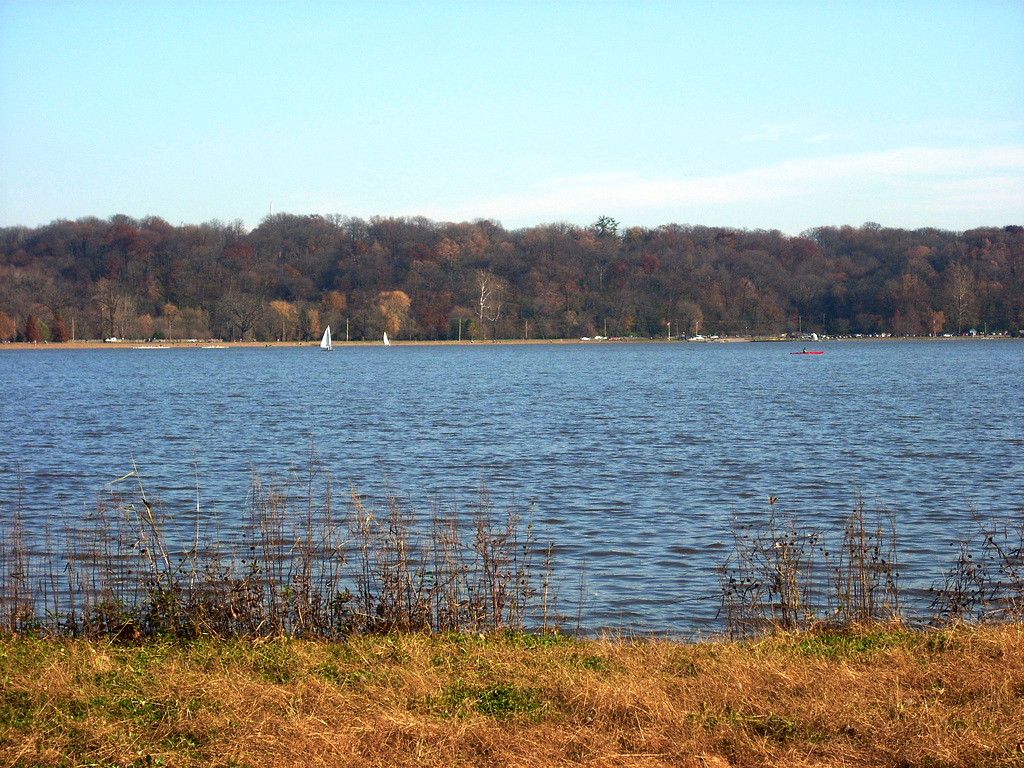
Creve Coeur park at the north end of the township

Maryland Heights Township is a township in St. Louis County, Missouri.
