= American Orchid Society =

- Formation: 1921; 105 years ago
- Founded at: Boston, Massachusetts
- Type: Horticultural society, 501 (c) (3) nonprofit
- Location: 10901 Old Cutler Rd. Coral Gables, Florida 33156
- Members: 10,000 (2011)
- President: Jay Balchan
- Affiliations: 600 local orchid societies
- Budget: $2.5 million (2009)
- Revenue: $215,232 (2016)
- Disbursements: $800,000
- Expenses: $204,168 (2016)
- Endowment: $2,135,423 (2016)
- Staff: 22 (2004)
- Volunteers: 370 (2004)
- Website: www.aos.org

The American Orchid Society (AOS) is a horticultural society for education, conservation, and research of orchids. It was founded in 1921, and has an international membership. It is a nonprofit 501(c)(3) organization. It has been called an "industry group". As of 2001 it was the largest special interest horticultural organization in the world. The AOS is the parent organization for local orchid societies in North and South America. It is affiliated with 600 orchid societies worldwide. A local commercial orchid grower, Robert Fuchs, said, "The American Orchid Society has the best orchid library in the Americas and orchid art work that is phenomenal." As of 2004 annual dues were $40.

== Grants ==
As of 2004 the AOS had awarded over $800,000 in grants for research in genetics, conservation, pest and disease control, propagation and fragrance and other subjects. The Vallarta Botanical Gardens near Puerto Vallarta received a conservation action planning grant from the society. A grant of between $500 and $12,000 for graduate study in orchid research is offered by the organization. In 2004 four such grants for a total of $32,508 were disbursed.

== Publications ==
The society publishes a monthly magazine, Orchids, The Bulletin of the American Orchid Society (Note: Orchids: The Bulletin of the American Orchid Society OCLC 475125831, ISSN 1087-1950) and provides information about orchids and growing them via its website. The original title of the bulletin was American Orchid Society Bulletin from 1932 to 1995. (Note: American Orchid Society Bulletin OCLC 1480503, ISSN 0003-0252) Volume 1, Issue 1 of The American Orchid Society Bulletin was published in June 1932. It was styled, "A magazine devoted to the popularizing of orchids and their culture". The first editor was David Lumsden. An early editor of the bulletin was Louis Otho Williams, during his time as editor publication went from quarterly to monthly. Also while Williams was editor membership in the society grew from 200 to 3,000. The magazine has featured the paintings of Marion Sheehan. With her husband Tom Sheehan, she co-authored the longest running series in the magazine, "Orchid Genera Illustrated". John Thomas Curtis was a "well known contributor" to the bulletin. Stirling Dickinson, James Brasch and Rebecca Northen have also written articles for the bulletin.

The AOS also published a scientific journal, Lindleyana: The Scientific Journal of the American Orchid Society from 1986 to 2002. (Note: Lindleyana: The Scientific Journal of the American Orchid Society OCLC 13435778, ISSN 0889-258X) The journal's title commemorated John Lindley the father of orchidology and "the first taxonomist on a world scale." Lindleyana was hailed as the first real scientific journal when the first issue was published. It was called an excellent journal that "satisfies a long-felt need".

With membership one receives a copy of the society's book Your First Orchid and the Orchid Source Directory. The book Ultimate Orchid was written by Thomas Sheenan in association with the AOS and the Smithsonian Institution.

Paul H. Allen was a long time publication consultant for the AOS.

== Judging orchids ==
The organization trains and credentials judges for orchid shows. To become an AOS Accredited Judge takes seven years of study and practice. There are 30 AOS judging centers throughout the United States. It also sanctions judging events and gives awards for outstanding examples of orchids. One such award is the Highly Commendable Certificate for orchid hybrids granting the designation HCC/AOS. The highest level award is the First Class Certificate (FCC/AOS). Plants submitted for judging must meet established cultural, botanical or horticultural criteria. The qualities judges assess include color vibrancy, splash petals, spots and different-colored lips. Other scoring criteria include flower form, color of flower, size of flower, substance and texture as well as stem and arrangement of blooms. The awards are a prestigious accomplishment for hobbyists and can result in higher prices for commercial growers. Certain awards can make a particular type of orchid extremely valuable meaning thousands of dollars in increased profit for the grower. Fuchs holds the record for most awards at over 800.

== History ==
The American Orchid Society was formed in 1921 in Boston, Massachusetts at the Massachusetts Horticultural Society. At the first meeting a group of 35 men and one woman set goals of organizing orchid shows in various cities, establishing a plant register, and selecting a group of experienced growers to judge plants and recognize the ones with superior quality. The first president of the American Orchid Society was Albert Burrage. The image for the seal of the society and its Gold Medal of Achievement was designed that year by Blanche Ames. It features a Native American (modeled on the artist's son) looking at a branch of orchid blooms. The medal was first awarded to Blanche Ames and her husband Oakes Ames in 1924. The society had 18,000 members in 1976 and there were 250 affiliated local orchid societies. In 1981 the AOS offered a $50,000 prize for the creation of an artificial orchid hybrid.

In July 1984 the AOS moved its headquarters and orchid collection from Harvard University to the property of Lewis C. and Varina Vaughn in West Palm Beach, Florida. It was located at 600 S. Olive Ave and was valued at $1 million. The City of West Palm Beach designated the orchid as its official flower and adopted the nickname "The Orchid City". The collection was accessible to the public until 1988, when Lewis Vaughn died and the estate came under city codes prohibiting operation of a business in the residential neighborhood. Vaughn willed his property to the society and a special use permit allowed the AOS to occupy the 6 acre (2.4 ha) estate. The permit was so restrictive visiting members could not even tour the grounds. The local neighborhood association opposed the operation of the facility and for the next 13 years the headquarters were not open to the public.

The organization's website was launched in 1996. It is considered one of the best sources for information about orchids. The American Orchid Society was listed in "The Horticulture 100" a "list of the best American gardening books, horticultural societies, perennials, shrubs, and trees" by Horticulture magazine.

From 2001 to 2012 the society operated the American Orchid Society Visitors Center and Botanical Garden at Morikami Park in Delray Beach, Florida contiguous with the Morikami Museum and Japanese Gardens.

== New location ==
Facing financial struggles due to decreasing membership and donations and losses in its investments the AOS partnered with the Fairchild Tropical Botanic Garden and moved its facilities to the Fairchild campus in Coral Gables, Florida. Membership in 2001 was 29,000 (Note: Robinson 2001 states membership was over 30,000) in 2011 it was 10,000. With a $500,000 shortfall in its $2.5 million budget a decision was made to close the gardens, but supporters and local orchid societies raised funds to keep the gardens open and volunteers arranged to care for the plants. Society treasurer said, "When we moved to our home in Delray Beach, we thought it was our destiny. It wasn’t long before we found out we were not the best overseers of a public garden or that we should be in the retail business... We lost sight of the main thing — our members, conservation, education and research."

To commemorate its 95th anniversary in 2016 the AOS recreated a series of orchid advertising images from the 1940s. In 2017 the Fairchild Tropical Botanic Garden and the American Orchid Society presented an exhibit of historic and contemporary art inspired by orchids, "Orchids Through the Artists' Eyes".

== Awards and medals ==
=== Flower quality awards ===
The AOS grants three levels of awards for flower quality based on a 100 point scale.

- Highly Commended Certificate (HCC/AOS) - 75 to 79 points
- Award of Merit (AM/AOS) - 80 to 89 points
- First Class Certificate (FCC/AOS) - 90 to 100 points

=== Other awards for plants ===
- Judges Commendation (JC) - possessing distinctive characteristics but cannot be scored customarily
- Award of Distinction (AD) - for a worthy new direction in breeding
- Award of Quality (AQ) - one in a group of at least twelve that are an improvement over former type
- Certificate of Botanical Recognition (CBR) - a rare and unusual species with educational value (must pass taxonomic verification)
- Certificate of Horticultural Merit (CHM) - possessing characteristics that contribute to the horticulture of orchids

=== Awards for exhibitors ===
- Certificate of Cultural Merit (CCM) - robust well flowered specimen in care of exhibitor for at least 12 months prior, score of 80 to 89 points
- Certificate of Cultural Excellence (CCE) - robust well flowered specimen in care of exhibitor for at least 12 months prior, score of 90 to 100 points

=== Annual awards ===
- Benjamin C. Berliner Award
- Butterworth Prize
- Milton Carpenter Intergeneric Onciidinae Award
- Robert B. Dugger Odontoglossum Award
- Roy T. Fukumura Vandaceous Award
- Herbert Hager Phalaenopsis Award
- The Ernest Hetherington Cymbidium Award
- Fred Hillerman Award
- Merritt W. Huntington Award
- Ann and Phil Jesup Botanical Trophy
- Benjamin Kodama Award
- Carlyle A. Luer Pleurothallid Award
- Masatoshi Miyamoto Cattleya Alliance Award
- James and Marie Riopelle Miltonia Award
- Bill Thoms Award
- W.W. Wilson Cypripedioideae Award
- Nax Botanical Trophy

=== Medals ===
The AOS also issues medals and awards for service to the society, work in orchid culture and the research of orchids.

- Gold Medal of Achievement - highest recognition for distinguished contributions
- Silver Medal of Achievement - for a single project (prior to 1972 this was a plant or exhibit award)
- Achievement Award - for contributions to any aspect of orchidology including philanthropy and public relations
- Certificate of Meritorious Achievement in Orchid Education
- The Thomas Sheehan Award for Outstanding Service by an AOS Volunteer
- Ambassador Award - for lifelong service to the organization
- President's Award
- AOS Fellow - elected by the Board of Trustees
- AOS Award for Excellence in Hybridizing
- Distinguished Affiliated Societies Service Award

== Images ==
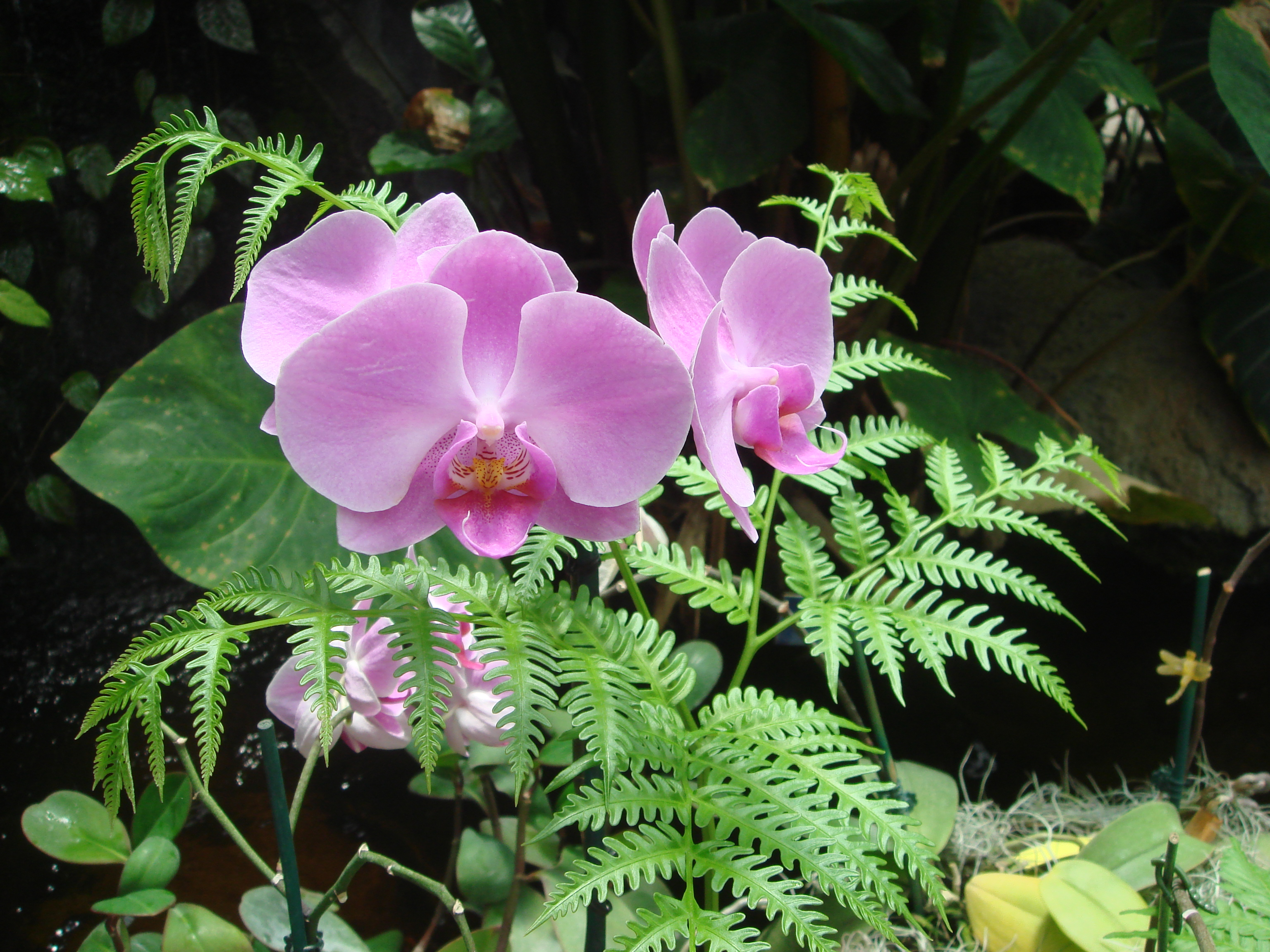
Phalaenopsis

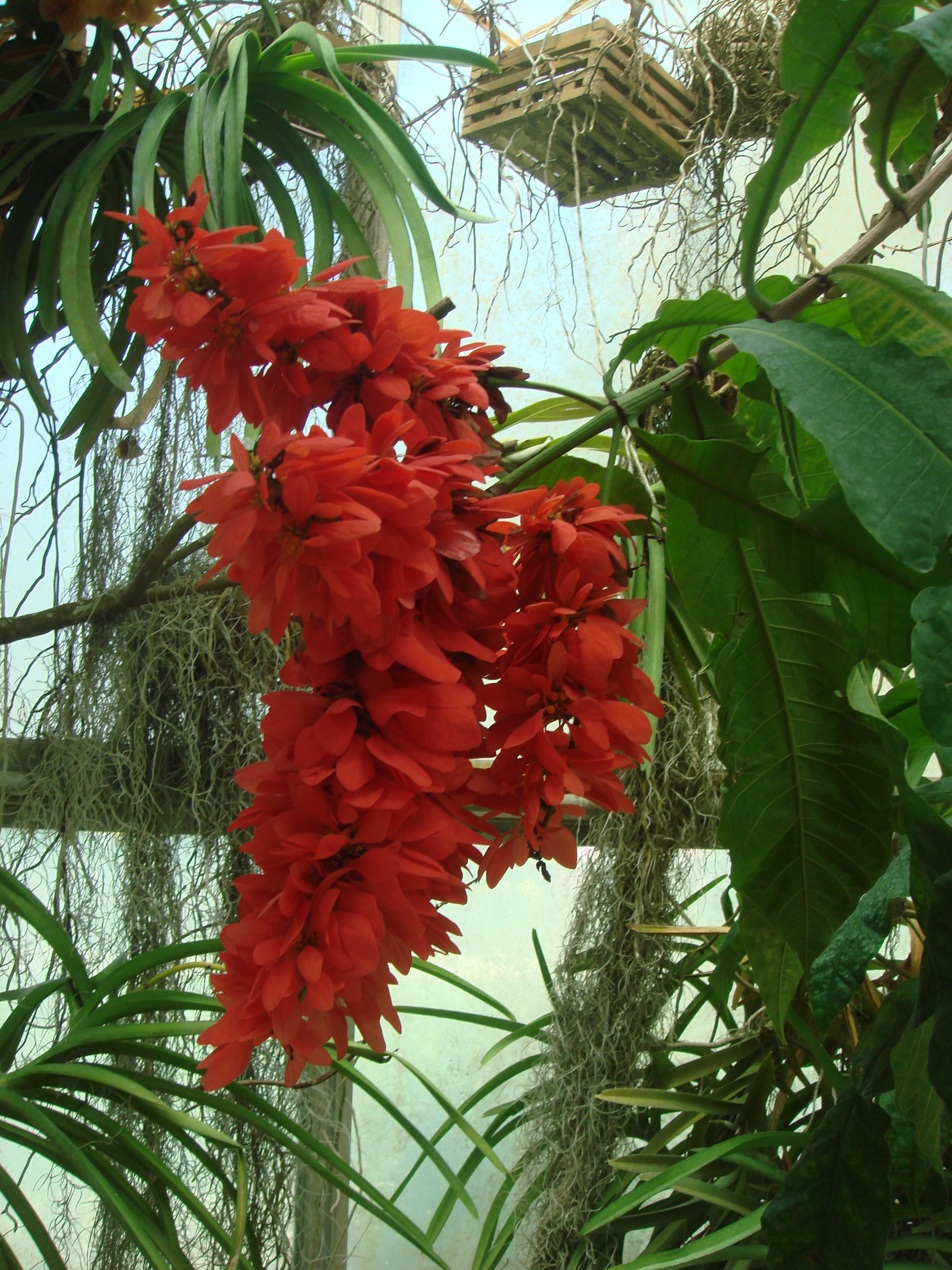
Non-orchid companion plant

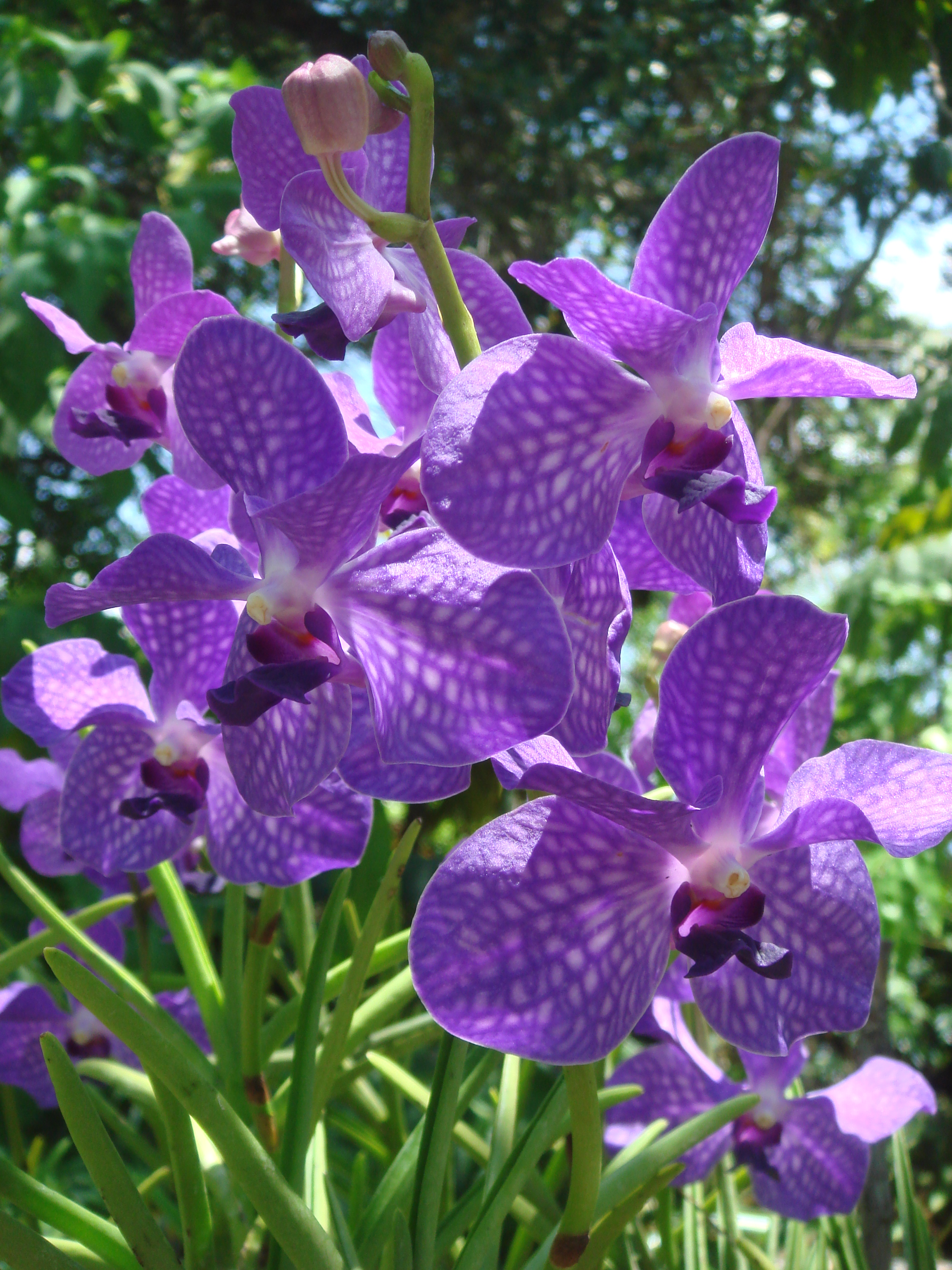
Vandaceous orchid

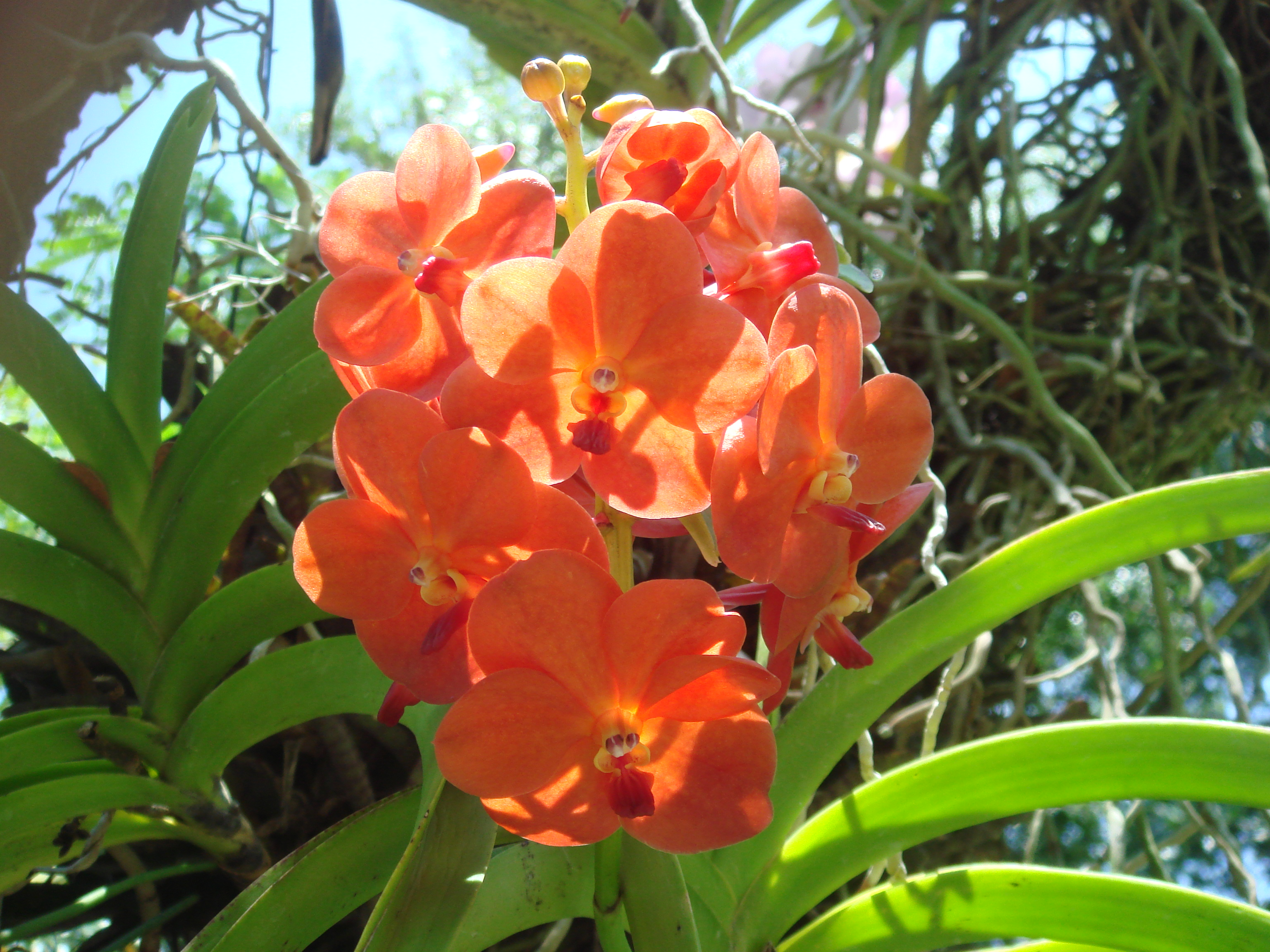
Vandaceous orchid
