= Virginia Snyder =

American journalist and private investigator (1920–2017)

Virginia Artrip Snyder (November 27, 1920 – March 20, 2017) was an American journalist, author, poet, private investigator, and community activist in Delray Beach, Florida. In 1976 she became the first woman in Florida to own a private investigative agency, and her investigations contributed to the release of six men from death row.

== Early life and education ==
Snyder was born on a farm near Winchester, Virginia, the oldest of six children. Early in her career she wrote a column for the American Hereford Journal. She was a member of the inaugural class at Florida Atlantic University when it opened in 1964, and graduated in 1965 with a bachelor's degree in government and politics, making her one of the university's first graduates.

== Journalism ==
Snyder worked as an investigative reporter for the Fort Lauderdale News and later the Boca Raton News, receiving seven national, state, and local awards. Her reporting included an 11-part series on conditions at the South Florida State Mental Hospital.

== Private investigation ==
In 1976 Snyder opened a private investigative agency based at the historic Cathcart House in Delray Beach, becoming the first woman in Florida to own one. Her work contributed to the release of six men from death row and of others serving life sentences for crimes they did not commit. Among her cases was that of Luis Diaz, who was imprisoned for more than two decades for the Bird Road rapes in Miami before his release. She frequently worked pro bono for indigent clients. She appeared on programs including 20/20, Today, Unsolved Mysteries, and Late Night with David Letterman, and has been cited as an inspiration for the television series Murder, She Wrote.

== Writing ==
Snyder was a published poet and belonged to several poetry societies, including the Florida Poetry Society and Poets of the Palm Beaches. In 1999 she published a poetry collection, Poems of Fact and Fantasy. In 2008 she published a memoir of her career, And Justice for All: The Improbable Story of Virginia Snyder, Investigative Reporter and Private Investigator, co-written with Sandra Reddemann. In 2016 the Boca Raton branch of the National League of American Pen Women honored her as one of seven "sages," describing her as an author, Florida's first female private investigator, and a human rights activist.

== Community work ==
In 1968 Snyder and a group of women from her Unitarian church founded the South County Neighborhood Center in Boca Raton. She was involved in founding Aid to Victims of Domestic Abuse (AVDA) in Delray Beach, advocated for reform of the Palm Beach County women's prison system, and helped secure land from George Morikami for the Morikami Museum and Japanese Gardens. She ran for mayor of Delray Beach in 2007.

== Honors ==
Governor Reubin Askew named her one of 14 Outstanding Women of Florida in 1975, and Governor Lawton Chiles named her to Florida's Finest in 1996. In 2015 she received a Lifetime Achievement Award from the Greater Delray Beach Chamber of Commerce and was inducted into FAU's Majestic Owls Society, which honors alumni on the 50th anniversary of their graduating class.

== Legacy ==
In 2012 Florida Atlantic University received Snyder's papers, a compilation of materials from her work as a news reporter, private investigator, poet, and community activist. They are held as the Virginia Snyder Collection in the university's Wimberly Library. In 2016 FAU featured her in Legacymakers: 100 Women of Distinction at Florida Atlantic University, a book honoring women connected to the university. In 2022 Maria I. Alvarez completed a thesis in FAU's School of Criminology and Criminal Justice examining Snyder's life and work, titled Justice on Demand: A Qualitative Case Study of Virginia Artrip Snyder.

== Death ==
Snyder died at her home in Delray Beach on March 20, 2017, at age 96.

== Works ==
- Snyder, Virginia Artrip (1999). Poems of Fact and Fantasy. Knott Publishing. ISBN 978-0-9674935-0-3.
- Snyder, Virginia; Reddemann, Sandra (2008). And Justice for All: The Improbable Story of Virginia Snyder, Investigative Reporter and Private Investigator. iUniverse. ISBN 978-0-595-45076-3.
