= Yamato Colony, Florida =

Japanese farming settlement in Florida, USA

Yamato Colony
- Ghost town
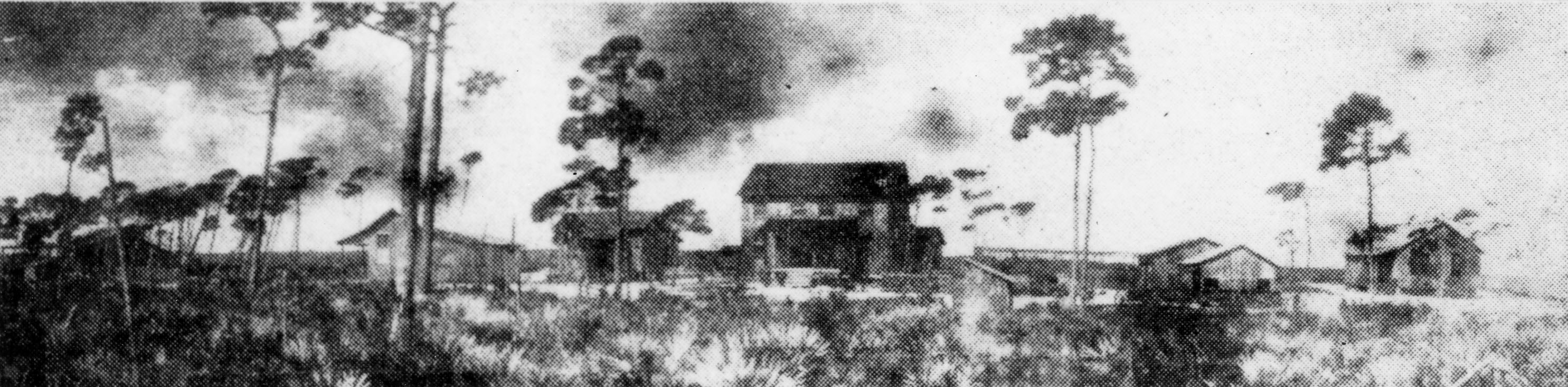
- The Yamato Colony in 1908 with the two-story house of founder Jo Sakai.

- Location within Florida Location within the United States
- Coordinates: 26°24′35″N 80°05′07″W
- Country: United States
- State: Florida
- County: Palm Beach
- Established: 1903
- Founder: Jo Sakai
- Time zone: UTC-5 (Eastern (EST))
  - Summer (DST): UTC-4 (EDT)

The Yamato Colony was an attempt to create a community of Japanese farmers in what is now Boca Raton, Florida, early in the 20th century. With encouragement from Florida authorities, young Japanese men were recruited to farm in the colony. There were as many as 75 Japanese men, some with their families, at the peak. There was "a cluster of two-story frame houses, a general store..., some packing houses."

Because of various difficulties, including blight, the colony never grew very large, and gradually declined until it was finally dispersed during World War II.

The Model Land Company was created by Henry Flagler to hold title to the land granted to his Florida East Coast Railway by the State of Florida. The company encouraged the settlement of its land, particularly by recent immigrants, to gain money from the sale of the land and to increase business for the railroad. In 1903, the company was referred to Jo Sakai, a Japanese man who had just graduated from New York University. Sakai purchased 1,000 acres (4 km^{2}) from the Model Land Company, and recruited young men from his hometown of Miyazu, Japan, to settle there. Several hundred settlers grew pineapples, which were shipped from the Yamato station on the Florida East Coast Railway. Pineapple blight destroyed the crop in 1908. In addition, the colony could no longer compete with cheaper (and earlier maturing) pineapples from Cuba. As a result, many of the settlers returned to Japan or moved elsewhere in the United States. The remnants of the colony were dispossessed after the entry of the United States into World War II, when their land was purchased to create a U.S. Army Air Corps training base (now the site of Florida Atlantic University and the Boca Raton Airport).

The only member of the Yamato Colony to stay in the area was George Morikami, who continued to farm in neighboring Delray Beach, Florida until the 1970s, when he donated his farmland to Palm Beach County to preserve it as a park, and to honor the memory of the Yamato Colony.

The Yamato Colony is remembered today in Yamato Road, a major street in Boca Raton, and in Morikami Park and the Morikami Museum and Japanese Gardens. Delray Beach is a sister city with Miyazu, in honor of George Morikami and the Yamato Colony.

== See also ==
- Yamato Colony, California

== Bibliography ==
- Curl, Donald W., ed. (February 1980). "T. M. Rickards and the Founding of the Japanese Colony" (PDF). The Spanish River Papers. VIII (2). Archived from the original (PDF) on November 2, 2021.
- Curl, Donald W., ed. (October 1977). "Yamato" (PDF). The Spanish River Papers. VI (1). Archived from the original (PDF) on November 2, 2021.
- Gregersen, Tom, "Yamato Colony", Boca Raton Historical Society
- Lynfield, Geoffrey (Spring 1985). "Yamato and Morikami: The Story of the Japanese Colony and Some of Its Settlers" (PDF). The Spanish River Papers. XIII (3). Archived from the original (PDF) on November 2, 2021.
- Kawai, Ryusuke (2020) [2015]. Yamato Colony: The Pioneers Who Brought Japan to Florida. Translated by Gergersen, John; Nishioka, Reiko (translation ed.). Gainesville: University Press of Florida. ISBN 081306810X.
- Mohl, Raymond A.; Pozzetta, George E. (1996). "From Migration to Multiculturalism: A History of Florida Immigration". In Michael Gannon (ed.). The New History of Florida. Gainesville, Florida: University of Press of Florida. pp. 395–6. ISBN 0-8130-1415-8.
- Niiya, Brian (1993). "Yamato Colony (Fla.)". Japanese-American History: An A-to-Z Reference from 1868 to the Present. New York, New York: Facts on File. p. 357. ISBN 0-8160-2680-7.
