= American Orchid Society Visitors Center and Botanical Garden =

Former botanical garden in Florida, US

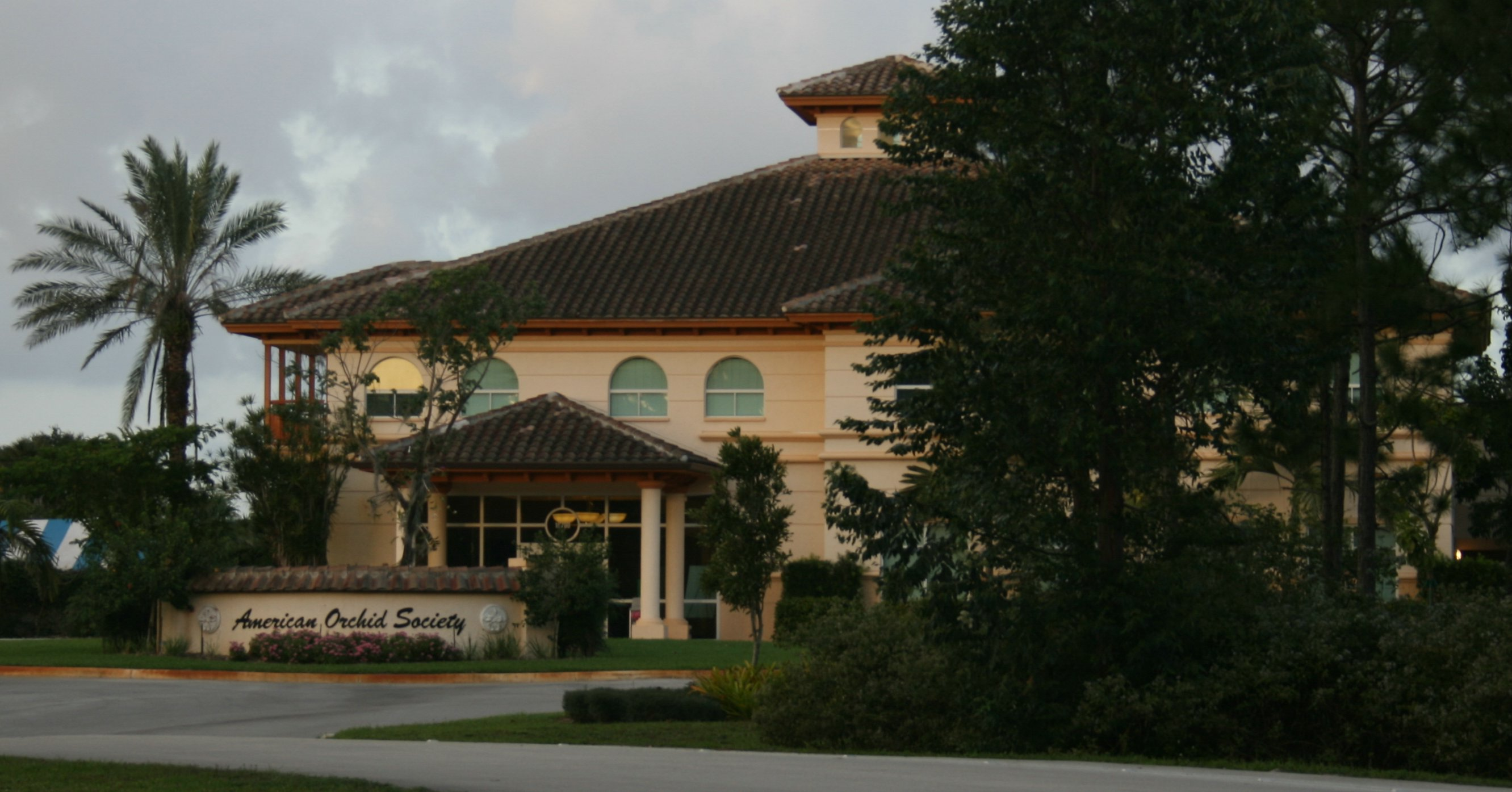
The American Orchid Society Visitors Center seen exiting Morikami Park

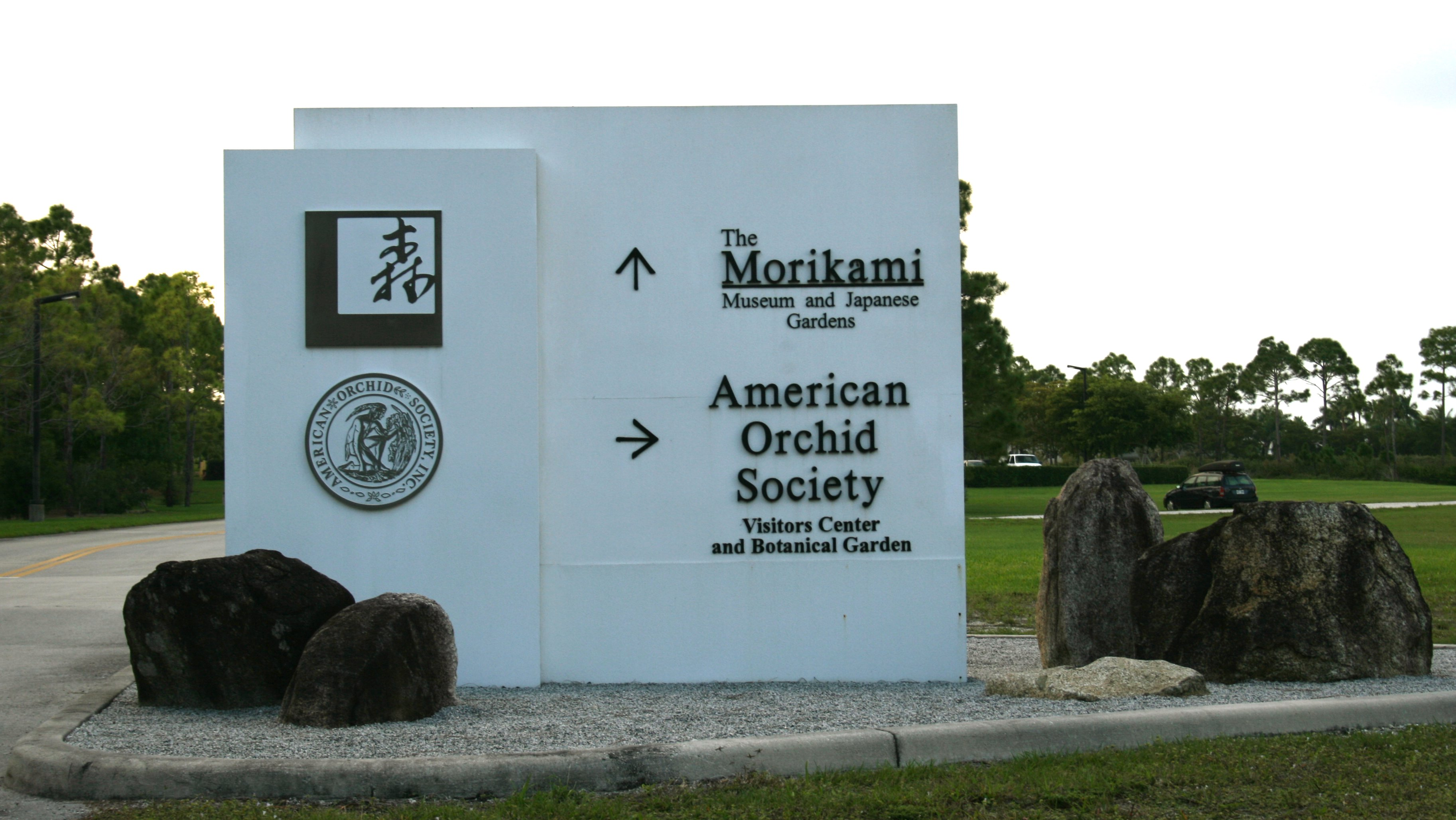
Direction sign at Morikami Park indicating American Orchid Society Visitor Center and Botanical Garden

The American Orchid Society Visitors Center and Botanical Garden was a 3.5 acres (1.4 ha) botanical garden specializing in orchids and home to the American Orchid Society. The facility was located in Morikami Park at 16700 AOS Lane, Delray Beach, Florida, United States, and included a 4,000 square foot (370 m^{2}) greenhouse open to the public.

The visitor center was a 20,000 square foot (1,900 m^{2}) Mediterranean style building that was designed by Song Associates of West Palm Beach, Florida. There were 3.5 acres (1.4 ha) of gardens with a design adapted from work by students at the University of Florida's Department of Landscape Architecture by Connie Roy-Fisher Landscape Architects of Jupiter, Florida.

In late 2011, the American Orchid Society sold the visitor center and garden and in 2012 moved the orchid collection to the Fairchild Tropical Botanic Garden in the Miami metropolitan area.

== See also ==
- List of botanical gardens in the United States
