= Rebecca Northen =

American author and horticulturalist

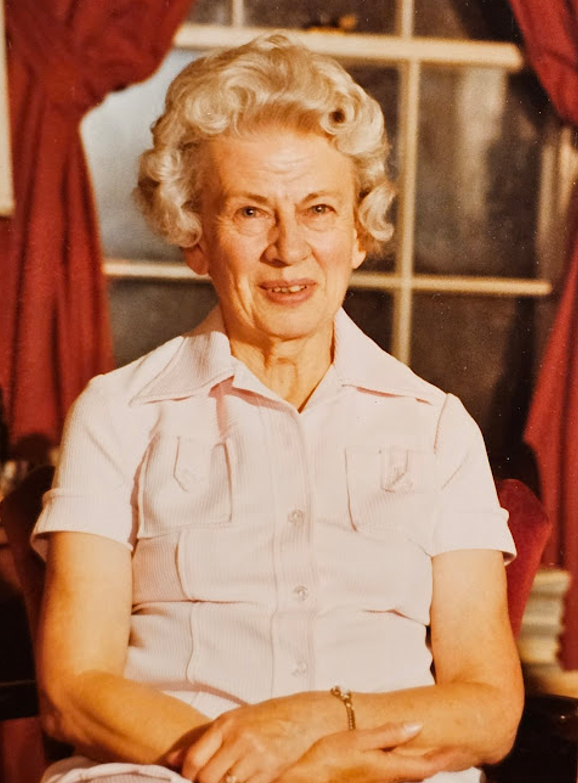
- Born: Rebecca Tyson; 1910; Detroit, Michigan, U.S.
- Died: 2004; Seattle, Washington, U.S.
- Education: Radcliffe College, Mount Holyoke College
- Spouses: Henry T. Northen (m. 1937)
- Children: Elizabeth Northen Lyons; Philip Tyson Northen; Thomas Henry Northen
- Writing career
- Years active: 1948–1990
- Notable works: Home Orchid Growing; Complete Book of Greenhouse Gardening; The Secret of the Green Thumb
- Notable awards: American Orchid Society Gold Medal of Achievement, Certificate of Meritorious Achievement in Orchid Education

Rebecca Tyson Northen (August 24, 1910 – April 30, 2004) was an American biologist and conservationist who published a book demystifying orchids in American home gardening. She has been referred to as the "Julia Child of Orchids".

She authored several books on orchid growing, including Home Orchid Growing, which was first published in 1950. Home Orchid Growing remains one of the most popular reference books for orchid growing to this day and has been referred to as "a bible for orchid growers".

Northen received recognition for her work in the field, including the American Orchid Society's Gold Medal of Achievement in 1979 and the Certificate of Meritorious Achievement in Orchid Education in 1999. Some orchids have been named in her honor including Clowesia 'Rebecca Northen', and Laelia anceps 'Rebecca Northen'.

== Biography ==
Rebecca Tyson Northen was born in 1910 in Detroit, Michigan. She studied biology at Radcliffe College and received a master's degree from Mount Holyoke. Just after graduating, she went off to a summer botany camp in Wyoming, which was "still considered the 'Wild West' in those days". She married Henry T. Northen, her professor, in 1937 and they settled down in Laramie, Wyoming.

She first discovered her love for orchids when her husband came home with a flask of hundreds of tiny orchid seedlings. She filled the entire house with them, including the bathtubs, and soon built a greenhouse, selling her orchids in large quantities to pay for the orchid hobby and the greenhouse heating bills. She soon became uniquely skilled in growing orchids, especially in the hostile climate of Laramie. She traveled across the world collecting orchids, "from the Himalayas to the jungles of Central America".

In the late 1940s she wrote to the Denver Post in response to a question about how to get orchids to bloom, and was then flooded with queries to the point that eventually a book publisher contacted her. She proceeded to write several books on the topic. Her book Home Orchid Growing explains how to grow orchids in the home rather than a greenhouse, and delves into scientific topics like the genetics of flower color and the use of colchicine to induce tetraploid formation. She and Henry coauthored The Secret of the Green Thumb and the Complete Book of Greenhouse Gardening.

In the late 1940s, she co-authored articles on orchid culture with her husband Henry in the Journal of the American Orchid Society. She and Henry coauthored a paper in Plant Physiology. She and published papers in the Journal of the American Orchid Society for beginner orchid growers.

In her old age she worked for orchid conservation, helping to establish conservatory in Costa Rica and advocating for rainforest preservation.
