= George Morikami =

Japanese-American farmer (1886–1976)

- Born: Sukeji Morikami; November 4, 1886; Miyazu, Kyoto, Japan
- Died: February 29, 1976 (aged 89); Delray Beach, Florida

Sukeji "George" Morikami (November 4, 1886 – February 29, 1976) was the son of a tenant farmer in Japan who immigrated to the United States to join the Yamato Colony, a Japanese agricultural colony in Florida. He was contracted to work for three years at the colony and then receive a bonus. He intended to return to Japan with his bonus, but his sponsor at the Yamato Colony died and Morikami did not receive anything. He started out penniless, but by the mid-1920s he owned 1,000 acres (400 ha) of farmland and ran a mail order business shipping produce throughout the United States. He lost everything when the Florida land boom of the 1920s collapsed. He started over on borrowed money, and built up his business again, but had to withdraw from the mail-order business due to health problems. He again lost everything during World War II. He had acquired about 200 acres (81 ha) by the late 1960s, most of which he donated in 1973 to Palm Beach County for what became Morikami Park.

== Early life ==
Morikami was born in 1886 in Miyazu, Kyoto, Japan, the eldest of six children of Takezō, a tenant farmer, and Soyo Morikami. He attended an agricultural school after graduating from elementary school. He sought marriage with a girl, Hatsu Onizawa, who was five years younger than he, but her father rejected Morikami because his father was a farmer. Morikami was recruited to join the Yamato Colony in what is now Boca Raton, Florida. Under the sponsorship of Mitsusaburo Oki, a silk merchant from the nearby town of Mineyama, Morikami was loaned ¥300 (about $150 at the time) to cover the expense of the journey, in return for which he was obligated to work for the colony for three years. At the end of the three years he was to receive a bonus of ¥1,000. (At that time, many farming families in Japan had a cash income of just ¥3 to ¥4 a month.)

== Immigration ==
Morikami was 19 years old when he immigrated to the United States in 1906, to join the Yamato Colony. He intended to take the bonus money and return to Japan. Mitsusaburo Oki, Morikami's sponsor and a major investor in the Yamato Colony who had joined the colony, died in December 1906, shortly after Morikami joined the colony. Oki's death left Morikami uncertain as to whether his debt would be paid off by working for the colony, and whether he would receive the ¥1,000 bonus at the end of the three years, but, as he had no funds of his own, he stayed with the colony. In the end, he did not receive any bonus, and could not afford to return to Japan.

Hoping to improve his command of the English language, Morikami sought employment as a live-in domestic servant. He did not succeed, but was hired by a boatbuilder in Eau Gallie. As the job was hard labor for low pay, and did not help him learn English, he quit, rented a small plot of land, and grew vegetables which he sold door-to-door. While the vegetables sold well, he was not able to save enough money to pay for English lessons. With help from a former member of the Yamato Colony who was farming in Eau Gallie, Morikami enrolled in fifth grade in the local elementary school, which he attended for a year. During this time he learned that the girl he wanted to marry, Hatsu Onizawa, had married.

== Farming success ==
Morikami returned to the Yamato Colony. A friend allowed Morikami to use a one-half-acre (0.20 ha) plot rent-free on the condition that he clear the land. That friend also allowed Morikami to room with him rent-free. He was extended credit by a local merchant for seeds, food and clothing. Although he had only a few hand tools, Morikami harvested enough tomatoes from his small plot that season to clear $1,000 after expenses. He had carried his tomatoes to the packing house by hand in a burlap sack, and bought a wheelbarrow as soon as he had the cash available.

With his profits in hand, Morikami began buying small parcels of farmland, sometimes for as little as $15 an acre. He bought some land from members of the Yamato Colony who were returning to Japan. With the increase in his land holdings, he hired half-a-dozen farm hands. After discovering that the agents he sold his produce to were making a profit of a dollar a bushel, Morikami started a mail-order business selling his produce. He sent postcards advertising his produce to businesses listed as good credit risks in a credit guide he borrowed from a bank. Operating as the George S. Morikami Company, he eventually was shipping produce all over the United States, including to California, Washington, and Alaska. Morikami had to start buying produce from other farmers in order to fill all the orders he was receiving. The pressure of operating his business affected his health, and he developed a stomach ulcer.

== Wealth and bankruptcy ==
By the mid-1920s, Morikami was a wealthy man. Like many residents of Florida during the 1920s land boom, Morikami bought and sold land, making large profits. He owned about 1,000 acres (400 ha) and had about $250,000 deposited in several banks and, in his own words, "lived like a millionaire". After a woman he had proposed to died suddenly, Morikami abandoned the house he had been building for them in Delray Beach, and moved into the Kentucky House, a resort hotel in Delray Beach. The real estate bubble of the Florida land boom collapsed in 1926. All of the banks in which Morikami had deposited his money closed, and he lost everything.

Morikami was able to borrow $5,000 and revived his mail-order business. He continued to earn a profit from that business even after the stock market crash in 1929. However, the success of his business meant that he once again had to buy produce from other farmers to fulfill orders, cutting into his profits, and the stress of running the business brought back his stomach ulcer. In late 1932, Morikami started spitting up blood and collapsed in the field of a sharecropper he was talking to. After almost half of his stomach was removed, he was advised to give up his mail-order business for his health, which he did.

== World War II and after ==
After the United States entered World War II, the land in and around the Yamato Colony was taken to create an Army Air Corps training base (see also: Boca Raton Airport). Two Japanese families remaining at the Yamata Colony were dispossessed (as were many non-Japanese living in the area. Morikami did not own any land in the confiscated area, but the U.S. government seized control of his farming business, and froze his assets until early 1942. Merchants would not sell seeds or fertilizer to Morikami, and a severe windstorm damaged his crops. As a result, Morikami was forced to become a tenant farmer. Although he earned very little while working as a tenant farmer, after the war he inherited land from the family for which he had worked.

After World War II, Morikami lived frugally, living for a while in a shack with a leaky roof and no electricity or telephone. During that time, an intruder attacked Morikami during the night, seriously injuring him. A visitor calling on him the next morning found him, and Morikami was taken to a hospital. On recommendation of the police, Morikami bought a pistol for self-protection. In 1955, Morikami bought a small house trailer to live in. Morikami's health had deteriorated. He suffered from a hernia, severe arthritis, the loss of almost all of his teeth, and intestinal blockages, occasionally spitting up blood. He also had sustained injuries in accidents, breaking a rib in a fall and badly burning his leg on his tractor's exhaust pipe when he fell getting off it. In the 1950s Morikami wrote to relatives about plans to return to Japan or to move to South America, but did neither. In December of 1967, Morikami became an American citizen. Early in 1968, the city commission of Delray Beach named Morikami honorary mayor of the city. By this time Morikami had acquired about 200 acres (81 ha), worth almost $1,000,000.

== Donations ==
As Morikami had no family in America, he considered how he could leave his name to posterity. In the 1960s Morikami donated some of his land to the State of Florida for use as an agricultural experiment station. In 1967, Morikami offered to donate most of his land to the State of Florida for use as a state park, but was turned down because his property was less than the 300 acres (120 ha) minimum that the state would accept. Morikami then tried to donate the land to the city of Delray Beach, but the property was well outside the city limits, and the city commission did not feel it had the funds available to develop a park. Morikami finally offered most of his land (he kept 15 acres (6.1 ha)) to Palm Beach County for a park to be named after him, and the county accepted the donation in 1973. Morikami was present for the dedication ceremony for the park in March 1974, posing with a shovel in hand for photographers. The publicity brought many letters to Morikami, mostly asking for money. Fearing for his safety, Morikami asked newspapers to stop writing about him.

== Ties to Japan ==
Although Morikami never returned to Japan, he wrote regularly to his relatives in Japan, discussing family affairs and relating details of his work and life. Morikami's youngest brother, Yoneji, died in 1943. Morikami sent money to Yoneji's widow and paid for the education of his children. Morikami donated the money for a 10-foot (3.0 m) tall stone lantern that stands close to a war memorial in his hometown of Miazu. He also donated money for the rebuilding of the elementary school and for a kindergarten in Miazu. Morikami starting sending letters and holiday cards to his early love, Hatsu Onizawa, but it is unknown if she ever responded. In 1960, while planning to travel to Japan to see Onizawa, Morikami applied for and received a new Japanese passport. Morikami was an avid reader. He subscribed to Japanese magazines such as Kingu and to a newspaper from Miazu. He also read books on agriculture to improve his farming techniques. He experimented with growing vegetables and trees from seeds that he ordered from Japan.

== Death ==
Morikami died in his house trailer on February 29, 1976, two years after the dedication ceremony for Morikami Park. He was cremated. Half of his ashes are at Morikami Park, while the other half were eventually returned to Miyazu. There is a monument to him in the Roji-en Japanese Gardens in the park. Delray Beach is a sister city to Miyazu in honor of George Morikami.

== Sources ==
- Ashton, Jacqueline (1979). Boca Raton: From Pioneer Days To the Fabulous Twenties. Boca Raton, Florida: Dedication Press. ISBN 0-9604898-1-9.
- Kawai, Ryusuke (2020) [2015]. Yamato Colony: The Pioneers Who Brought Japan to Florida. Translated by Gregersen, John; Nishioka, Reiko (Translation ed.). Gainesville, Florida: University Press of Florida. ISBN 978-0-8130-6810-7.
- Kawazua, Beth (2002). "George's Journey" (PDF). Morikami Museum and Japanese Garden.
- Kleinberg, Eliot (October 4, 2017). "George Morikami and other ex-Yamato colonists lost assets". myPalmBeachPost. Archived from the original on 2017-10-04.
- Marshall, Barbara (June 26, 2012). "George Morikami's stubborn dream". The Palm Beach Post. Archived from the original on March 29, 2023.
