= Morikami Museum and Japanese Gardens =

Art center, museum, and gardens in Florida, US

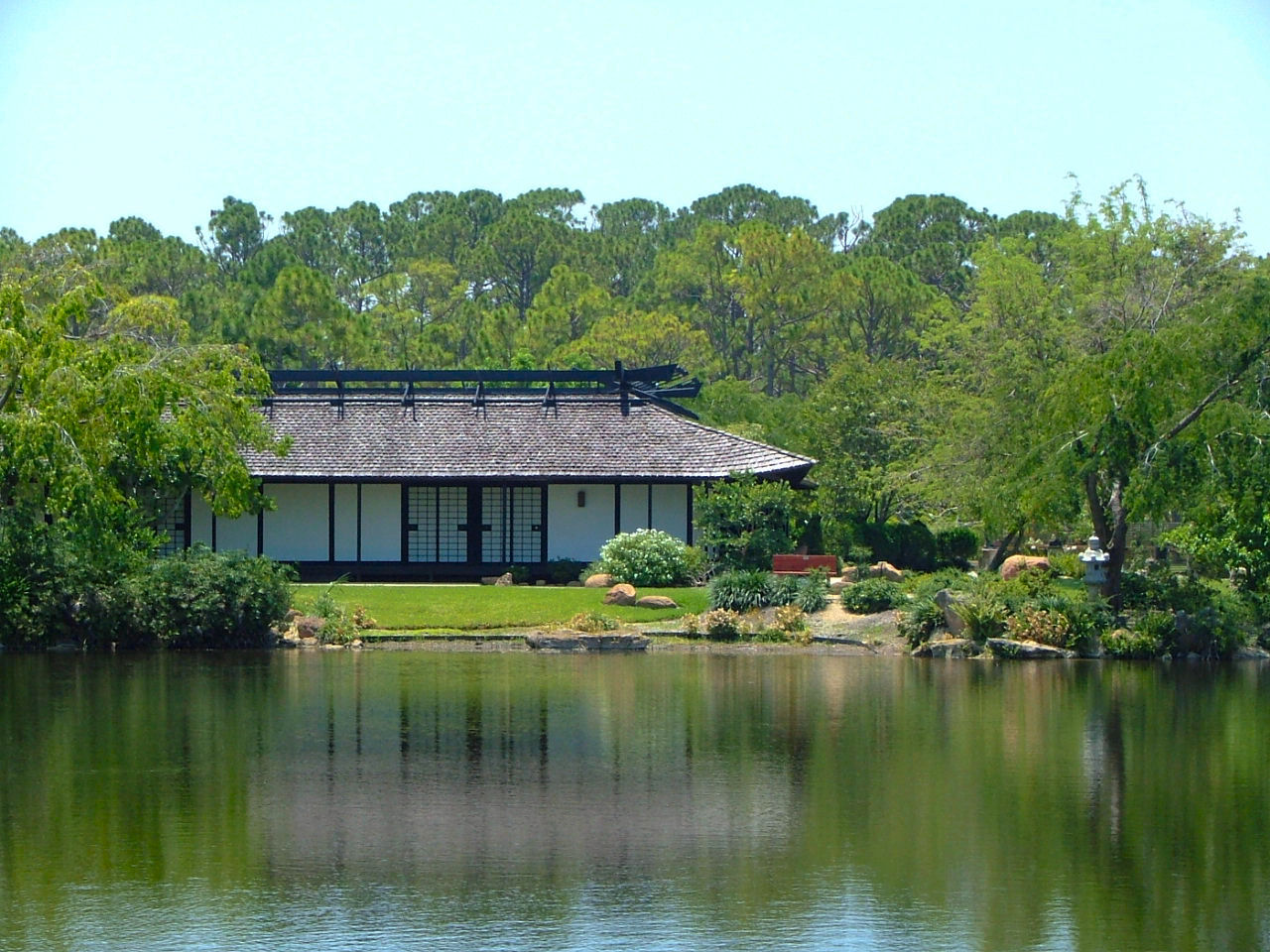
- The Yamato-kan, a Japanese style house in the Morikami Museum and Japanese Gardens

- Location within Florida Morikami Museum and Japanese Gardens (the United States)
- Established: 1977
- Location: 4000 Morikami Park Road; Delray Beach, FL 33446 (United States)
- Coordinates: 26°25′46″N 80°9′22.4″W
- Type: Art center, Art museum, Gardens
- Curator: Tom Gregersen
- Website: www.morikami.org

The Morikami Museum and Japanese Gardens is a center for Japanese arts and culture located west of Delray Beach in Palm Beach County, Florida, United States. The campus includes two museum buildings, the Roji-en Japanese Gardens: Garden of the Drops of Dew, a bonsai garden, library, gift shop, and a Japanese restaurant, called the Cornell Cafe, which has been featured on the Food Network and Vizcaya Television. Rotating exhibits are displayed in both buildings, and demonstrations, including tea ceremonies and classes, are held in the main building. Traditional Japanese festivals are celebrated several times a year.

The park and museum are named after George Morikami, a native of Miyazu, Japan, who donated his farm to Palm Beach County to be used as a park. George Morikami was the only member of the Yamato Colony, Florida, to stay in Delray Beach after World War II. He originally proposed donating the land to the City of Delray Beach which declined. The Museum was opened in 1977, in a building that is now named the Yamato-kan. The principal museum building opened in 1993. Construction of the Roji-en gardens began in 1993.

The Morikami Park, which includes the museum, is 188.5 acres (76.3 ha). There is one picnic pavilion and six smaller picnic shelters and a playground. It is the location of the Challenger Astronaut Memorial and the Yamato Pioneer Memorial.

The Morikami Museum and Gardens host a number of Japanese-influenced festivals each year, including Oshogatsu (New Year's) in January, Hatsume Fair Festival in April, and Lantern Festival, (based on the Japanese Obon festival) in October. These festivals draw visitors from around the state, and feature both food and art vendors. The Lantern Festival also features an annual drum performance and an interactive dance routine. Visitors release their lanterns into the central lake after sunset.

== Museum ==
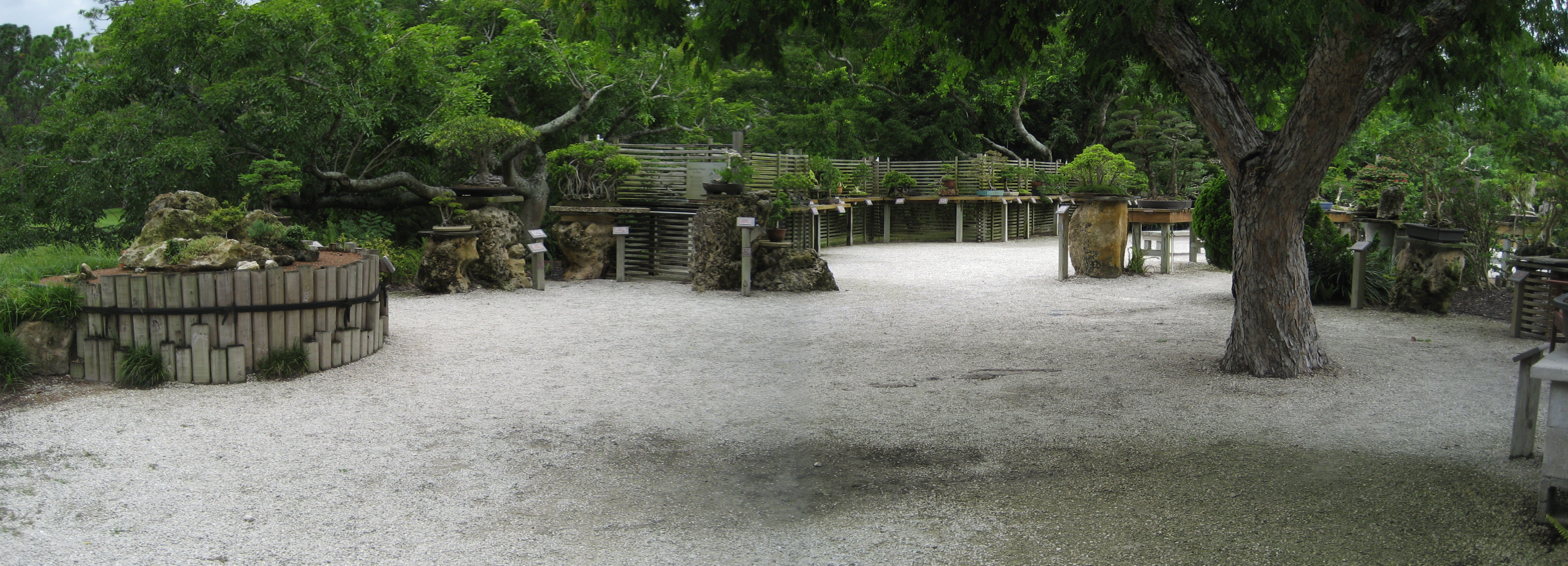
Bonsai Garden at the museum

The original museum building, Yamato-kan, is designed as a Japanese villa. It features a dry landscape garden and a permanent exhibit on the history of the Yamato Colony in Boca Raton, and a hands-on exhibit, "Japan Through the Eyes of a Child". The main museum building houses three exhibits, a 225-seat theater, a tea house, classrooms, a research library, a store, and the Cornell Cafe. There are more than 7,000 artifacts that make up Morikami's collection.

From May 2024 until August 2024 the museum showcased Kip Fulbeck's The Hapa Project exhibit. In addition to "The Hapa Project," the museum has showcased exhibits such as Painting Enlightenment: The Art and Science of the Heart Sutra, which explored the intersection of Buddhist art and modern neuroscience. The museum also has Nature, Tradition, and Innovation: Contemporary Japanese Ceramics, which highlights the evolution of ceramic practices through the lens of Japanese history.

Visitor Information The Morikami Museum and Gardens offer a range of amenities, including wheelchair-accessible pathways and wheelchairs available for guests upon request. Guided tours are offered for groups. The Cornell Café offers authentic Japanese cuisine with options for dietary restrictions. Outdoor seating provides views of the gardens

The museum offers regular cultural demonstrations, such as tea ceremonies and rock garden raking events, which showcase iconic Japanese traditions.

== Gardens ==
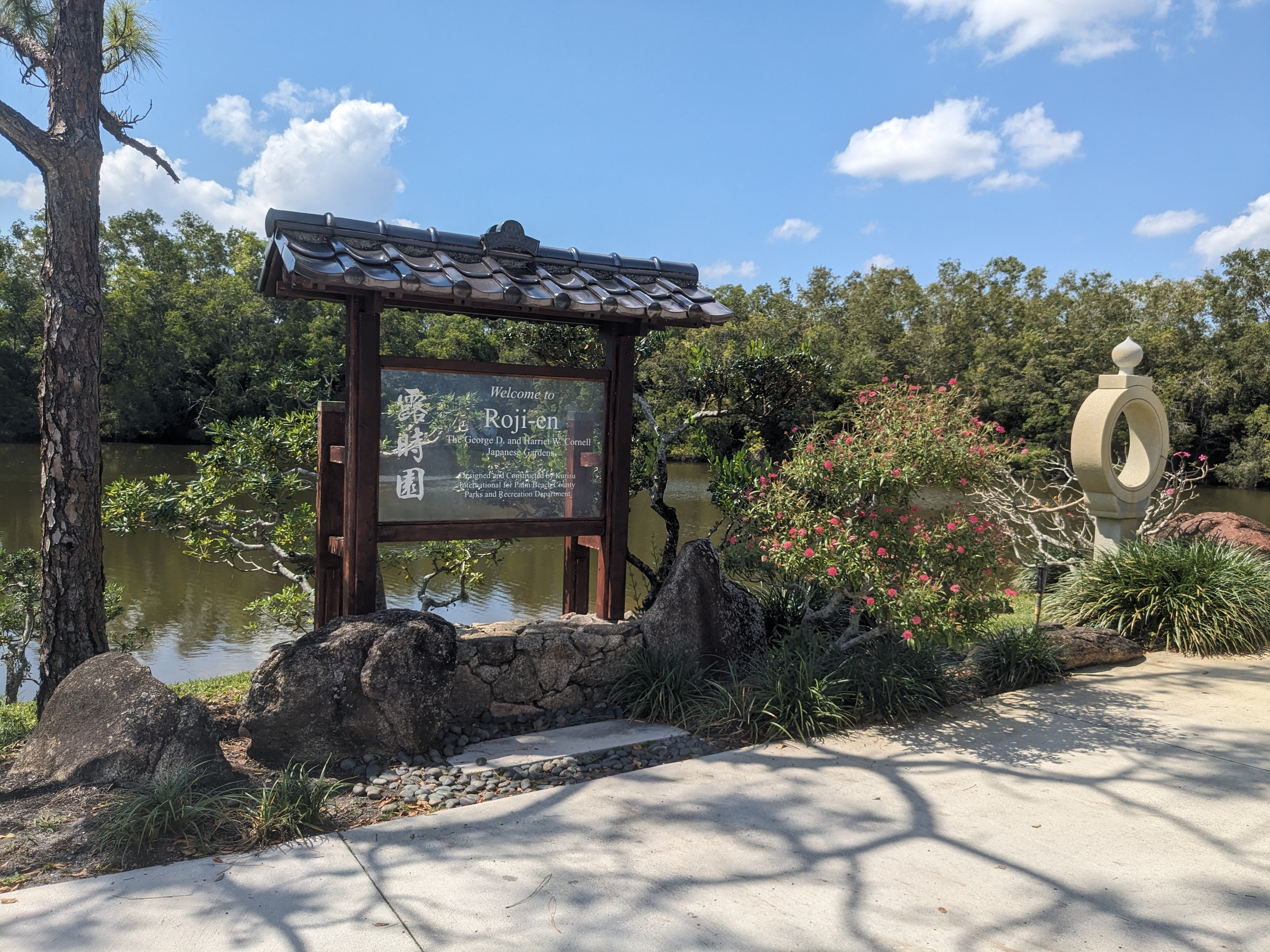
Roji-en Gardens entrance

The Roji-en Japanese Gardens were designed to complement the museum. The six gardens making up Roji-en are inspired by famous garden styles throughout Japan's history. They were designed by Hoichi Kurisu and completed in 2001. The six historical gardens are as follows: Shinden Garden, Paradise Garden, Early Rock Garden, Karesansui Garden, Hiraniwa Garden, and Modern Romantic Garden. The Shinden Garden is inspired by the gardens of the Heian period of the 9th–12th centuries. During this time Japanese nobility used Chinese garden designs that featured lakes and islands; this style of garden was usually viewed by boat.

The Paradise Garden comes from the Kamakura and Muromachi periods. The gardens were designed as temples to the Buddha and represented Buddhist Heaven. The Early Rock Garden is also from the Muromachi period. This style of gardens was influenced by Chinese landscape art and the early concept of Zen. The Muromachi period Karesansui gardens are in true Zen style. These gardens were designed not to be walked through, but instead to be viewed from temples and reflected on. The "dry landscape" styles was almost empty of plants, instead having rocks and gravel. The Edo period was known for the Hiraniwa Flat Garden style. These gardens were hybrids of the late rock garden and tea garden. This garden style is known for its accents, such as pagodas, lanterns, and stepping stones.

The last historical garden featured at Morikami is the Modern Romantic Garden. This garden originated during the Meiji period. Naturalism and Western influences were what spurred the creation of this garden style. The Morikami Museum and Japanese Gardens participates in the annual Gardens for Peace project, organized by the North American Japanese Garden Association (NAJGA). This initiative promotes peace and unity by bringing communities together in Japanese gardens. As part of the project, the museum hosts rock garden raking demonstrations in its Late Rock Garden, including designs symbolizing peace, such as the Japanese characters for heiwa (peace).

== Gallery ==
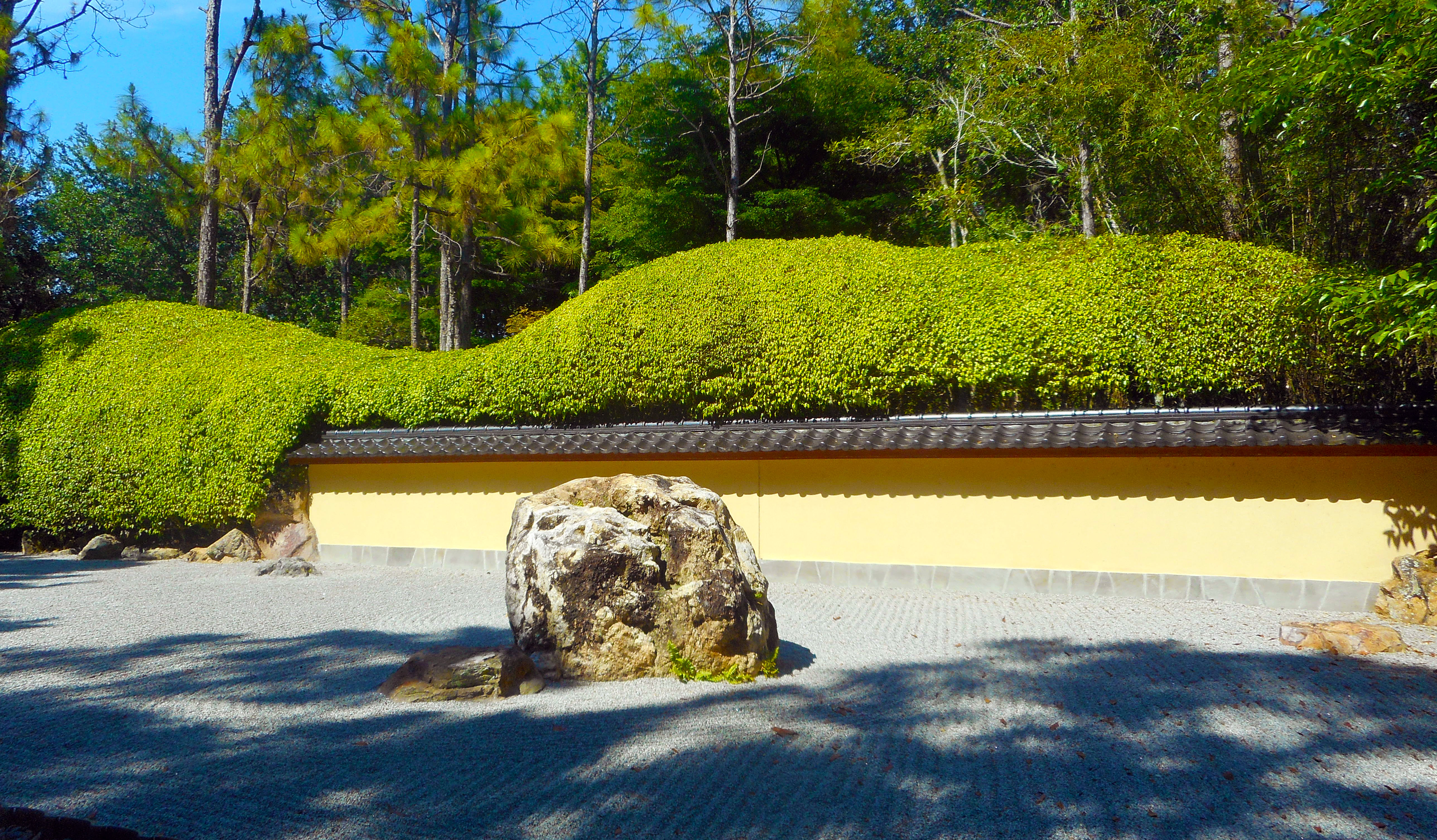
Rock garden

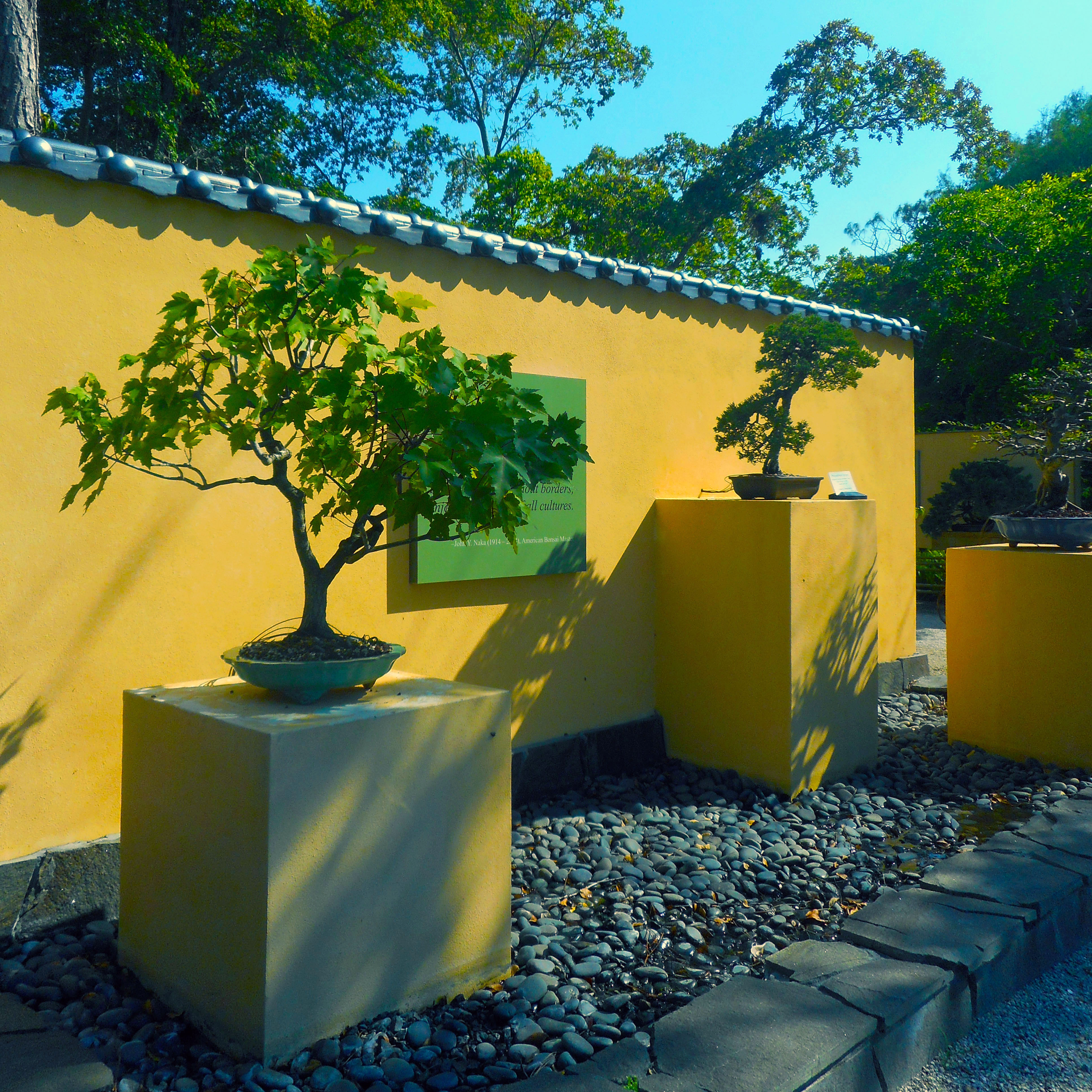
Bonzai trees

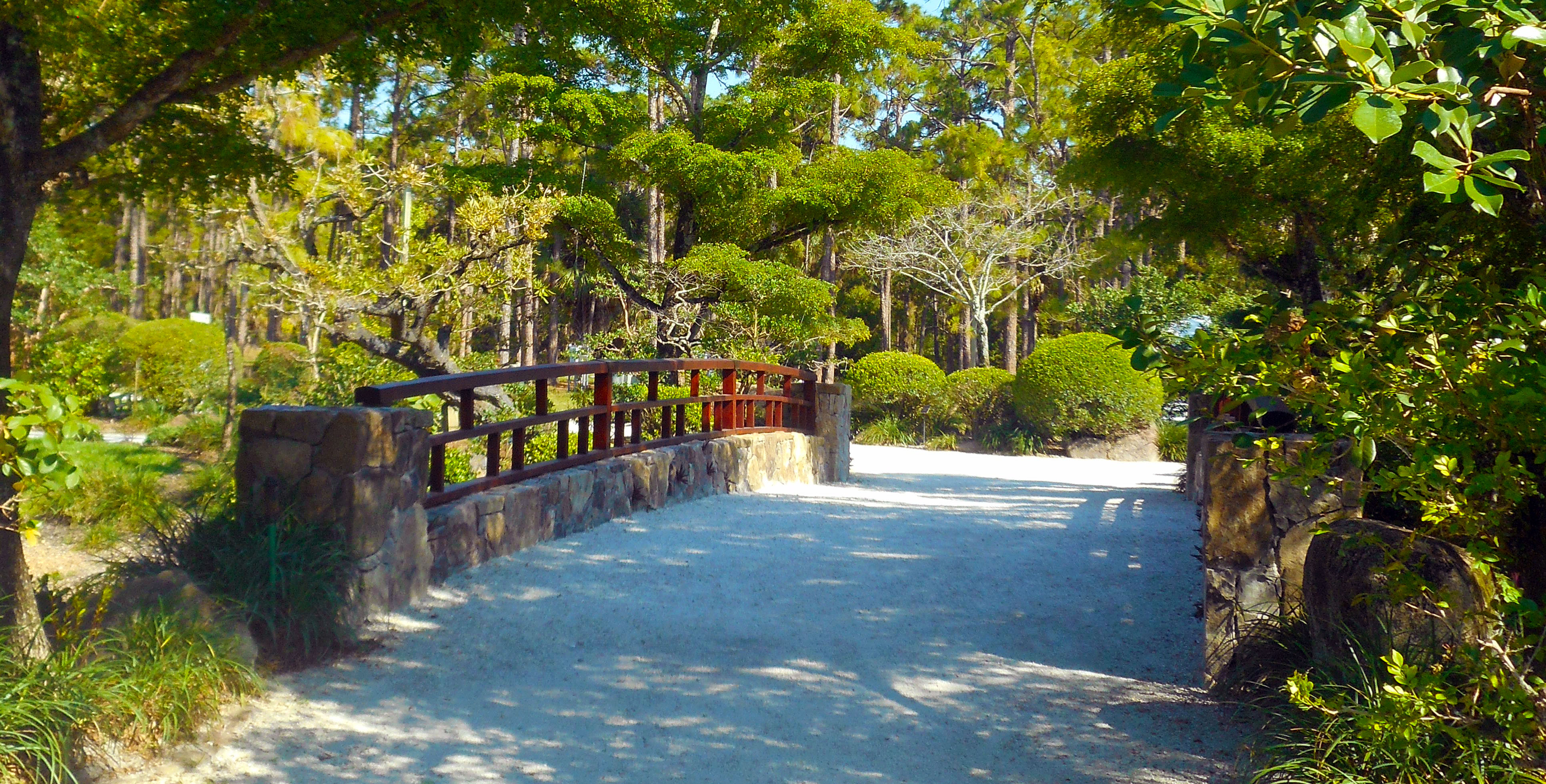
Japanese bridge

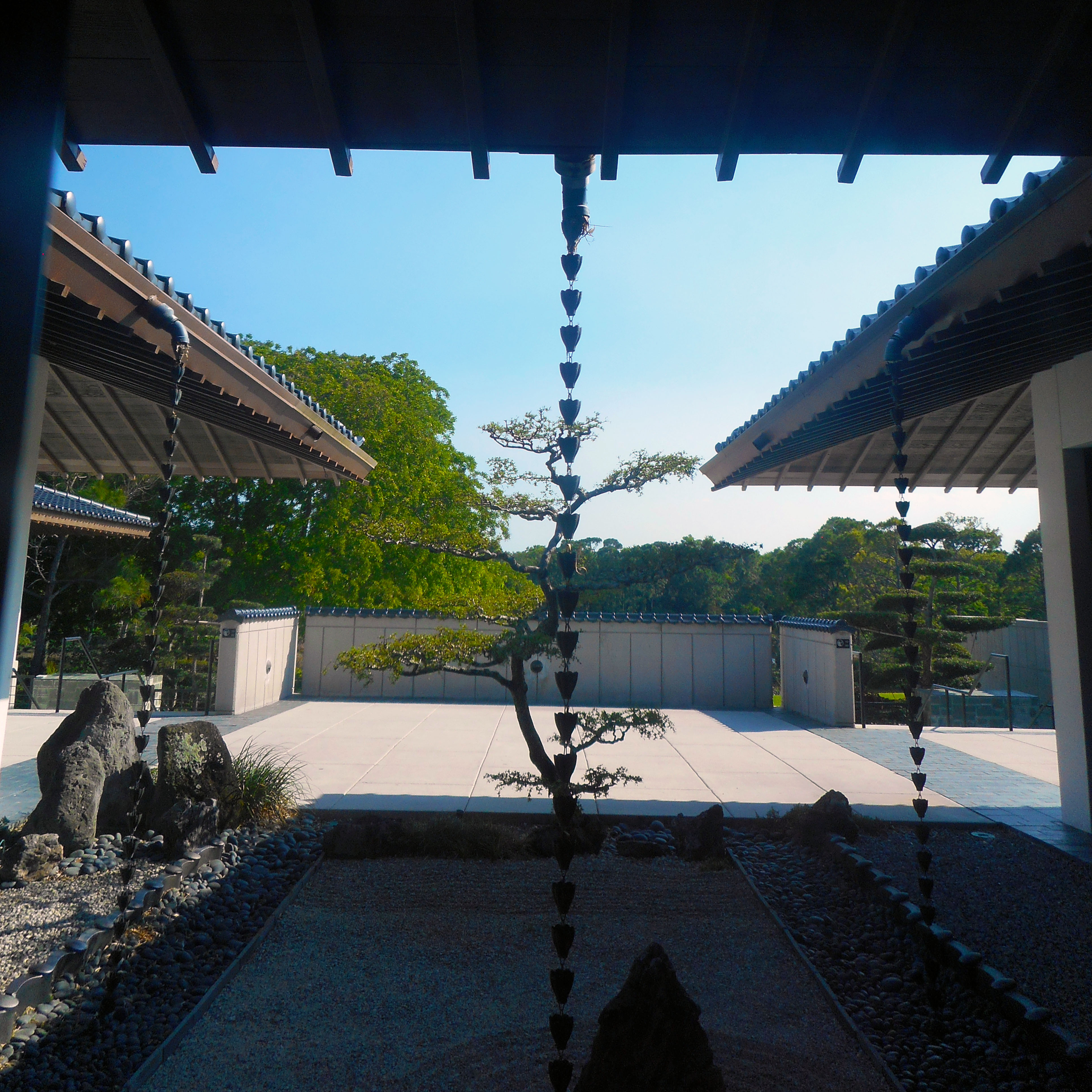
Center entrance

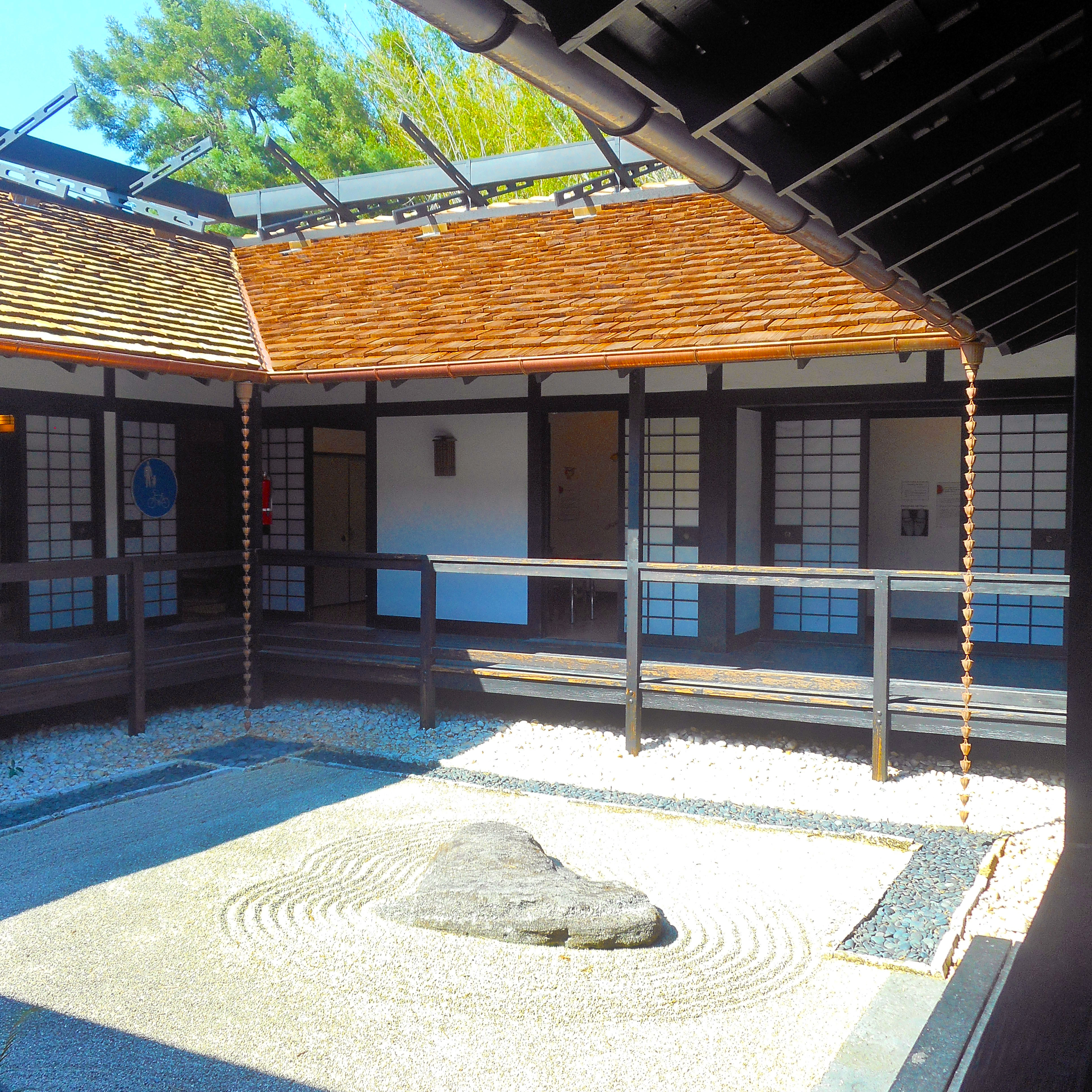
Tea House

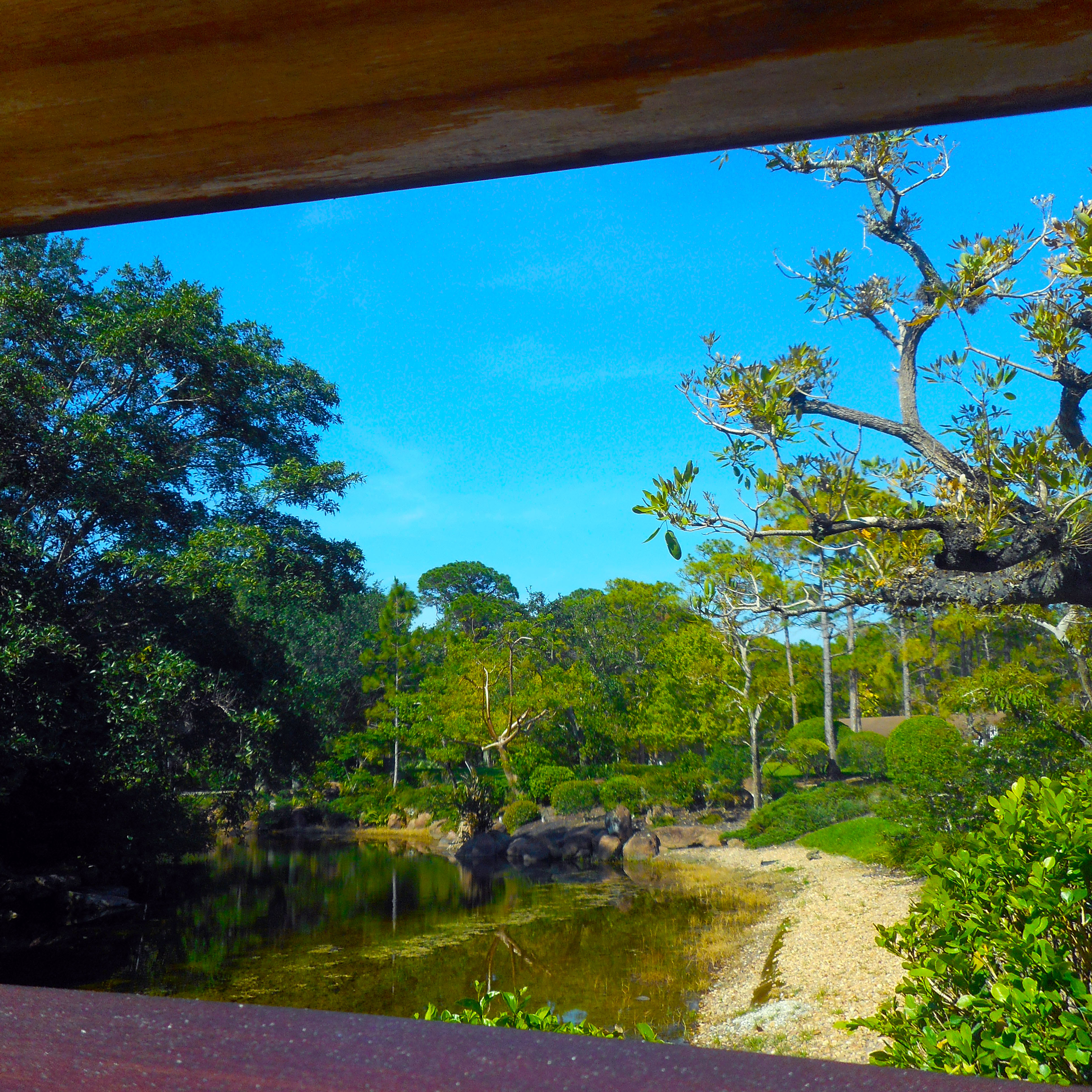
Grounds

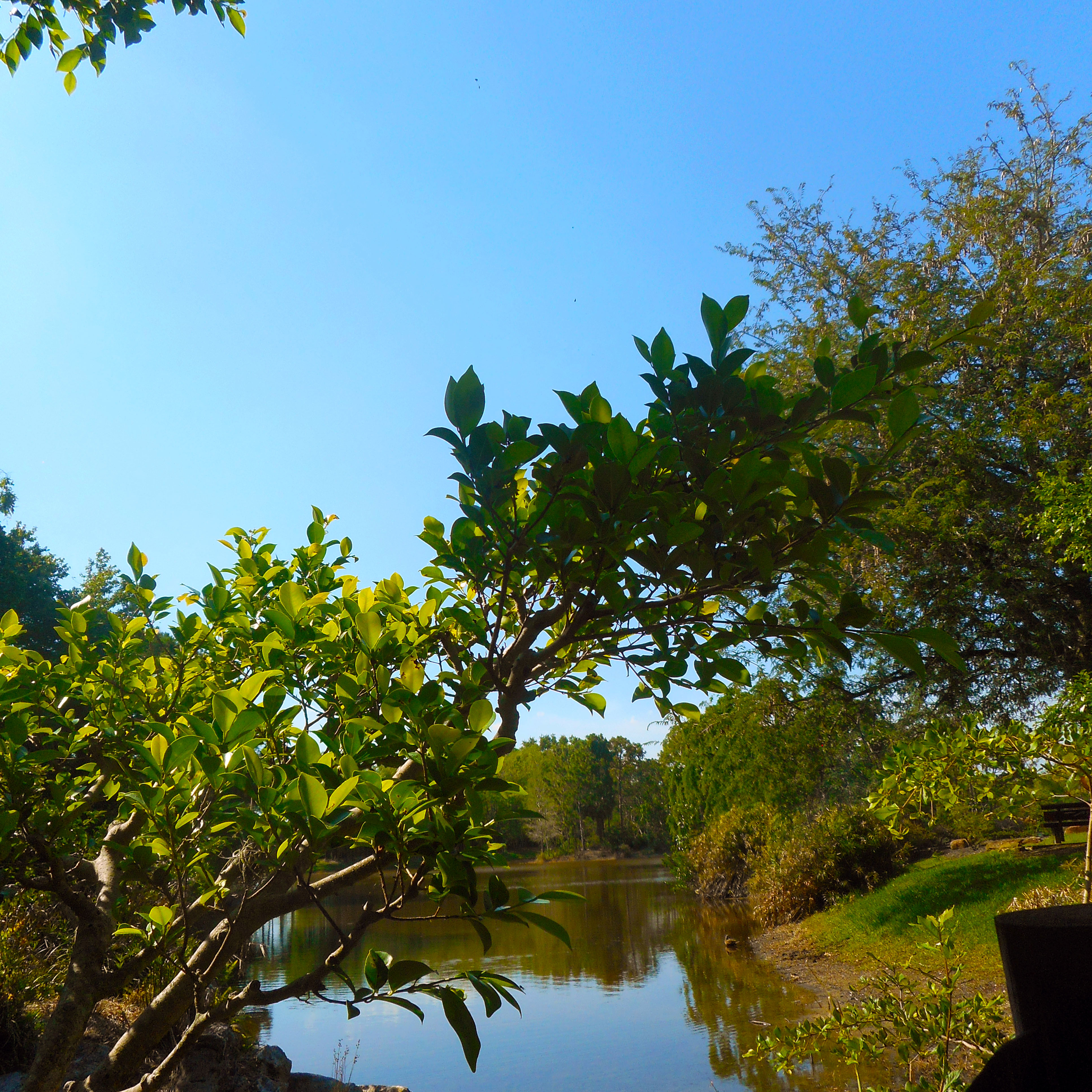
Lake from bonsai garden

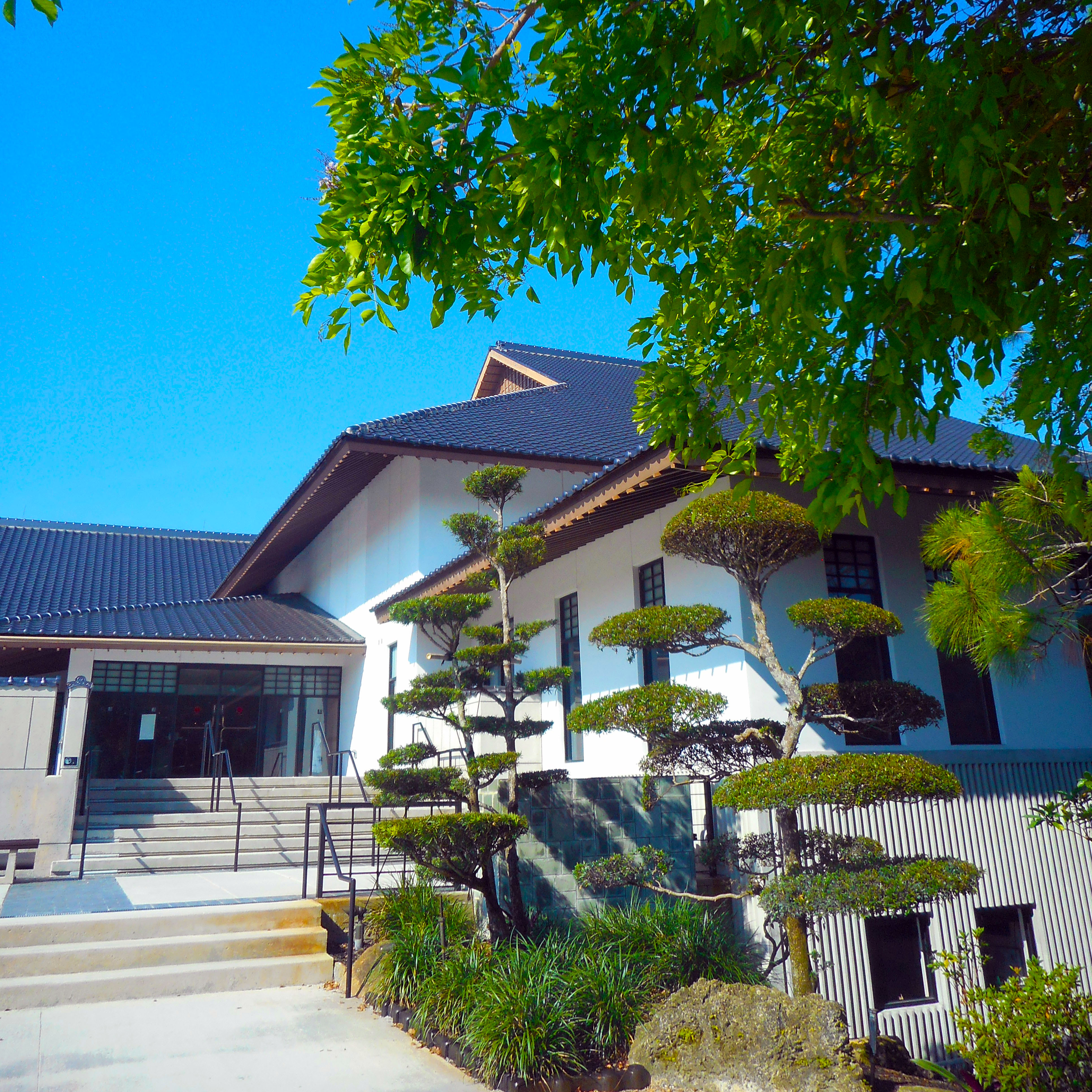
Garden entrance

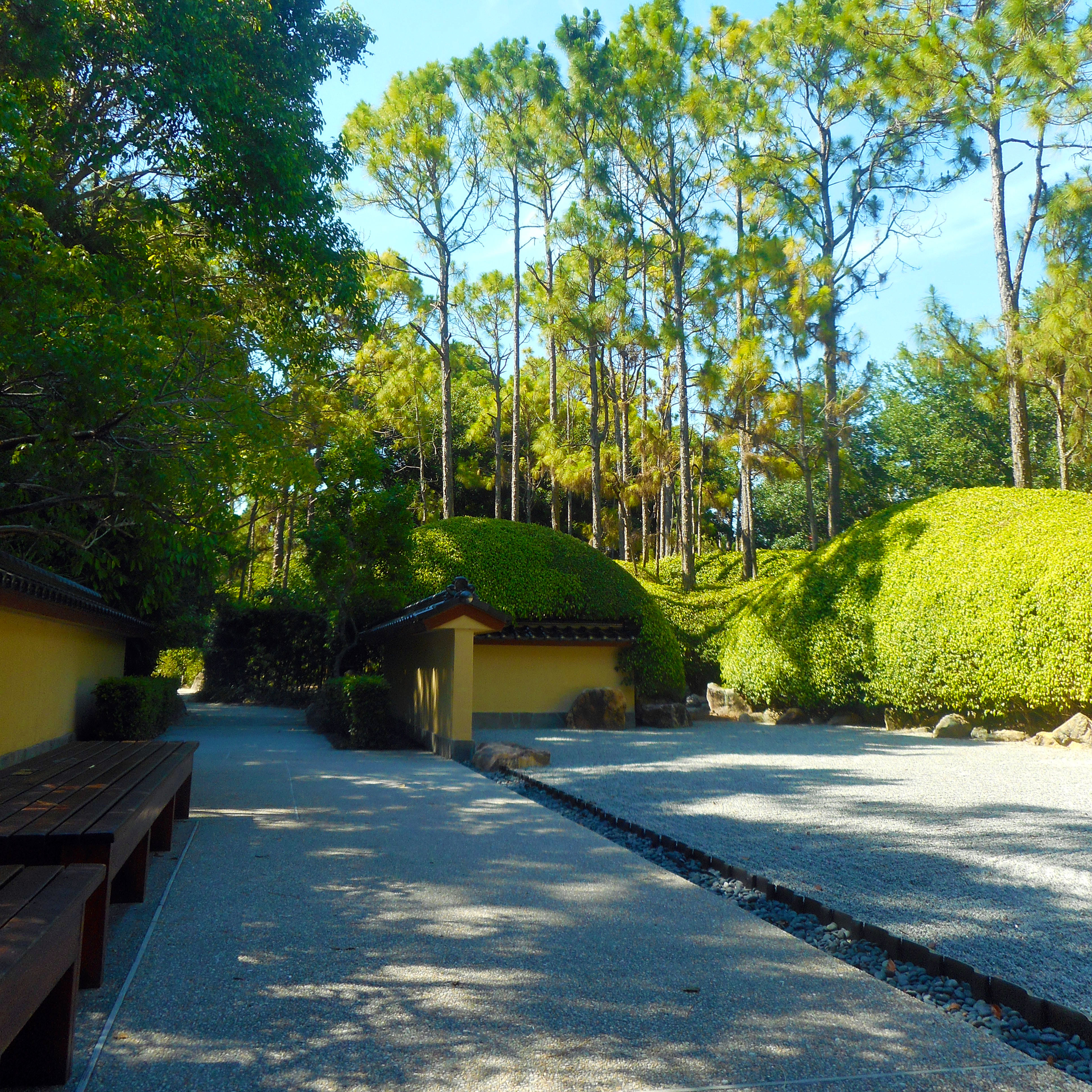
Rock garden

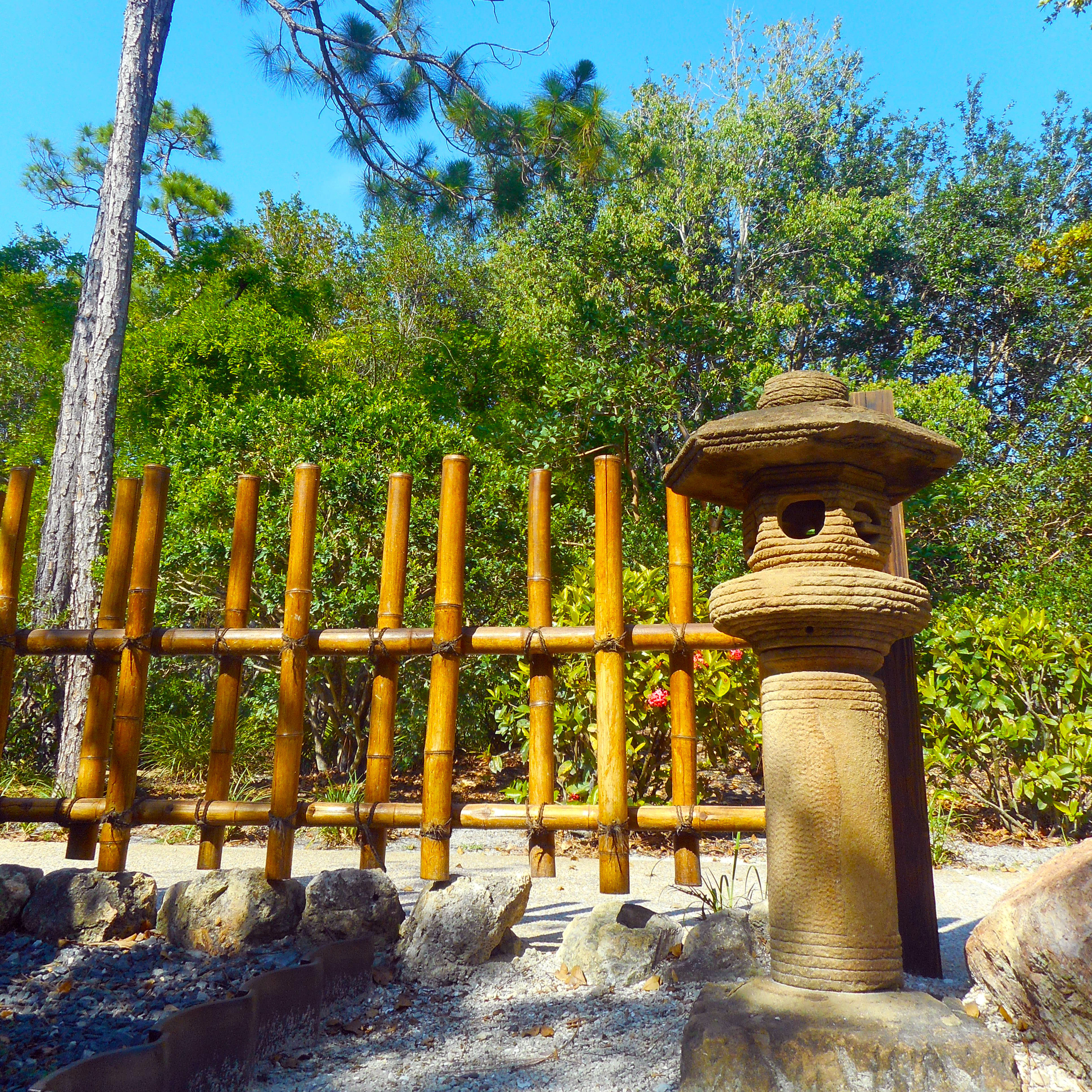
Grounds

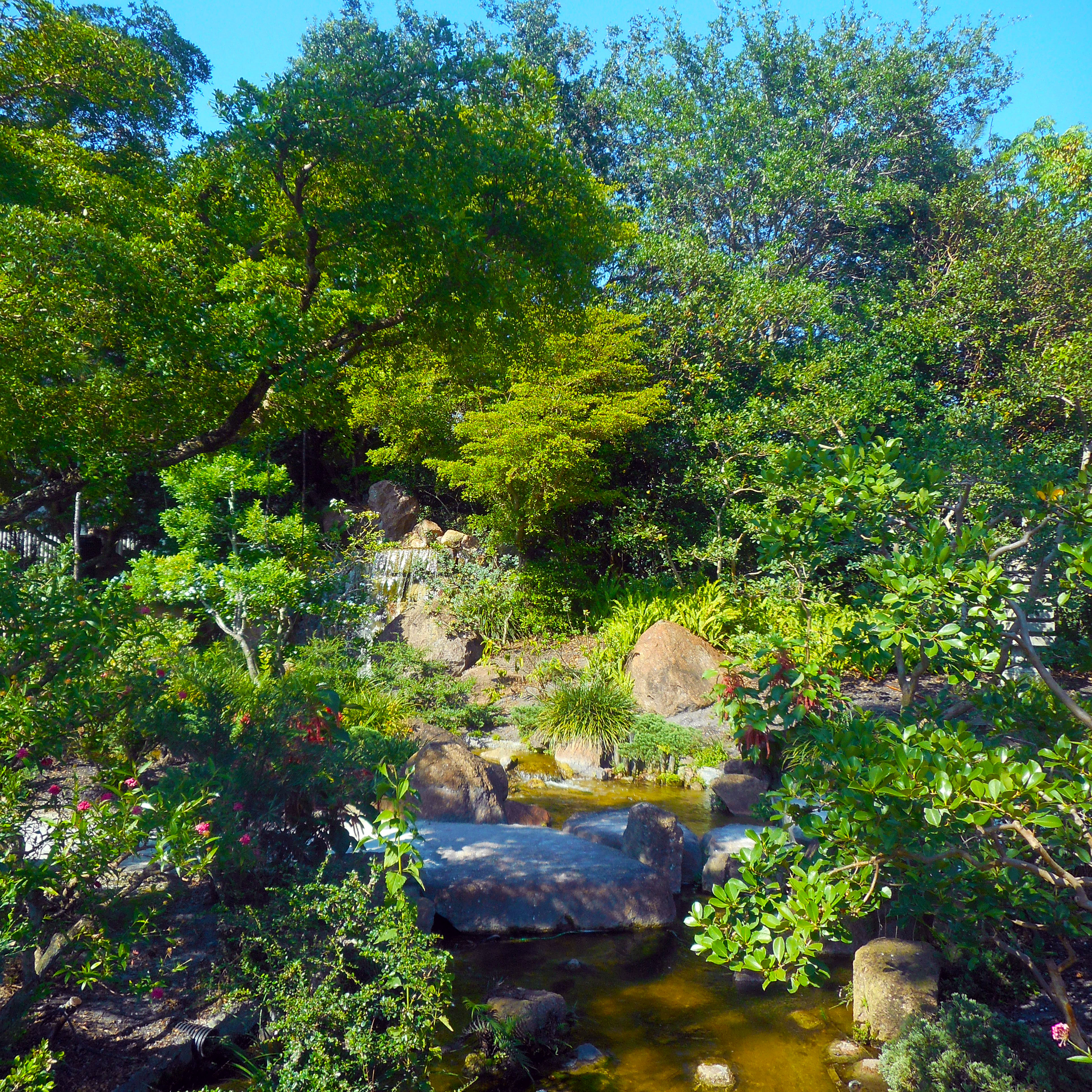
Waterfall

== See also ==
- Boca Raton, Florida
- Yamato Colony, Florida
