= Morikami Park =

Park in Palm Beach County, Florida

Coordinates: 26.42907°N 80.15646°W

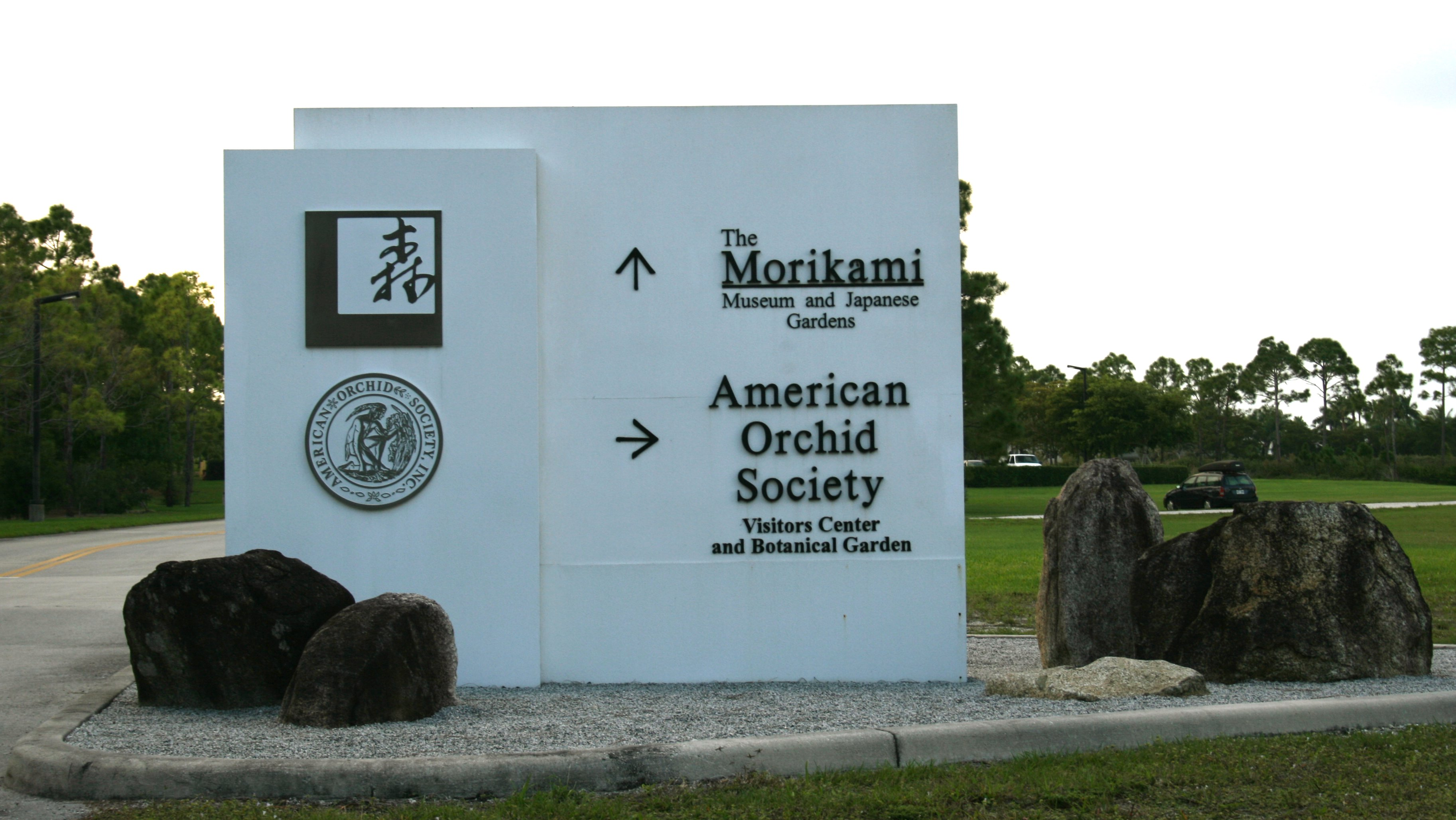
Entrance sign to Morikami Park

Morikami Park is a park in Palm Beach County, Florida. The park is named for George Morikami, a Japanese immigrant to Florida who donated the land for the park to the county. It is the site of the Morikami Museum and Japanese Gardens and includes picnic areas and playgrounds. The American Orchid Society Visitor Center and Botanical Garden also used to be located in the park, but the orchid collection was moved to Fairchild Tropical Botanic Garden in 2011, and the visitor center was sold.
