= Lamott =

Lamott or LaMott is a surname. Notable people with the surname include:

- Anne Lamott (born 1954), American novelist and non-fiction writer
- Kenneth Lamott (1923–1979), American writer
- Nancy LaMott (1951–1995), American singer

== See also ==
- Lamont (name)
