= Broken Sun =

- Directed by: Brad Haynes
- Written by: Dacre Timbs
- Produced by: Brad Haynes; Sasha Huckstepp
- Starring: Taki Abe; Rudi Baker
- Cinematography: Anthony Jennings
- Edited by: Hayley Lake
- Music by: Matteo Zingales
- Release date: 2008
- Country: Australia
- Language: English
- Budget: A$50,000
- Box office: A$5,089 (Australia)

Broken Sun is a 2008 Australian film set in 1944 about a World War II veteran who meets an escaped Japanese POW. The story is partly based on the Cowra breakout of 1944. The film was the debut feature from Brad Haynes.

== Reception ==
Reviewing the film for The Sydney Morning Herald, critic Sandra Hall, while admiring the efforts of first-time director Brad Haynes, concluded that it "suffers at times under the weight of its anti-war theme".
