= Takenaga incident =

Group surrender by a Japanese Army battalion in World War II

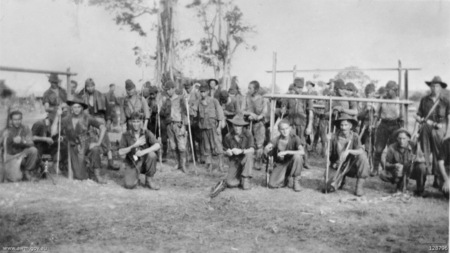
Takenaga's unit after surrendering (back row), with Australian Army soldiers (front row), taken before the Japanese soldiers were flown to Aitape. The third Australian soldier from the left is Lieutenant C. H. Miles.

The Takenaga incident (Japanese: 竹永事件, Hepburn: Takenaga jiken) was a surrender by an Imperial Japanese Army battalion that occurred on 3 May 1945, near the end of the Pacific War. The battalion, commanded by Lieutenant Colonel Masaharu Takenaga, (Note: In the Australian Army's official history of the war, the name is mistakenly transliterated as Tagenaka instead of Takenaga.) surrendered to the Australian Army in eastern New Guinea. This was extremely unusual for the Japanese Army, where surrender was seen as highly dishonourable.

== Background ==
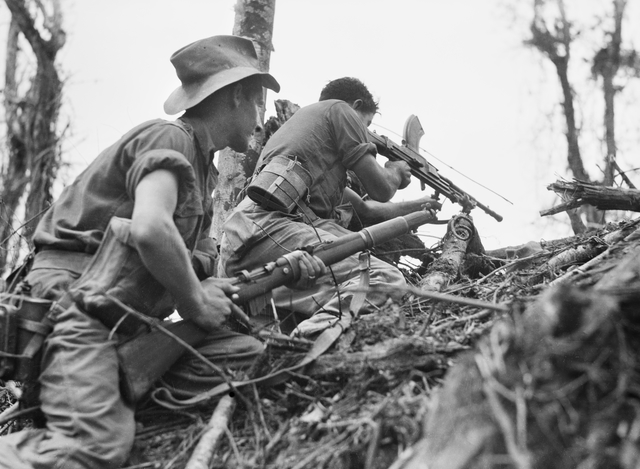
Australian soldiers attacking the Japanese Army in Wewak District, June 1945

In the New Guinea campaign, the Eighteenth Army of Japan were left behind the Allied front, and although their position was of no strategic value, they still continued to fight. After United States forces crushed the 18th Army's counteroffensive in the Battle of Driniumor River, the Japanese were left alone. When the Australian Army took over the New Guinea campaign in the second half of 1944, they decided to do a thorough cleanup of the remaining Japanese forces.

The strength of the Japanese forces was greatly weakened, as their naval supply lines had been cut and they had lost most of their existing supplies at Driniumor River. While the usual size of a Japanese Army division in wartime was 20,000 troops, at the start of May, 1945, this had been reduced to only around 1,000. (Note: The combined weaponry of the 41st and 20th Divisions was also reduced to 1 mortar, 20 heavy machine guns, and 24 light machine guns. There was even a shortage of pistols, and only 20–30 rounds available for each.)

Takenaga's unit was no exception: while it was a battalion in name, in terms of numbers it was on the scale of a platoon, and at that one with only around half the usual number of infantry. The rest of the unit was made up of former mountain artillery from the 41st Division, whose squads were disbanded when all of their guns were destroyed at Driniumor River, and marines, among others. Takenaga was an artillery specialist, and had been moved to the 239th Infantry Regiment from his post as commander of the 3rd Battalion, 41st Mountain Artillery Regiment.

The 18th Army had predicted that their food and medicine would run out by September, 1945, and that their weapons would become unusable by the end of the year. The situation was so dire that in July the 18th Army gave the order (18th Army Order No. 371) that the entirety of its forces should adhere to gyokusai, or honourable death without surrender, a move unprecedented even among the Imperial Army. One second lieutenant reflected that in the final stages of the campaign, the army had stopped being an army and had become a band of beggars.

The severity of the situation that the Japanese Army faced in New Guinea is demonstrated by the incidents of cannibalism that occurred there. Some commentators think that Takenaga's unit was among those where cannibalism was practised. There was suspicion that directly before they surrendered, Takenaga's unit ate the body of one of the villagers from Tau who had been killed in the fighting there, and the Australian Army decided to investigate. When they interrogated the prisoners from Takenaga's unit, they received statements indicating that some of the unit had been involved in eating the villager, but that the soldiers responsible had since died.

For this reason, the Australian Army did not bring any charges of cannibalism against the prisoners. There are also records from survivors written after the war admitting that they were involved. From the fact that Australian Army records state that Takenaga's unit was healthy and orderly, Yuki Tanaka infers that the whole unit regularly practised cannibalism as a group. Kiyohiko Satō, while admitting that some of the unit members were involved in cannibalism, casts doubt over Tanaka's conclusions by pointing to evidence such as descriptions in notes left by the soldiers that suggests cannibalism was not a group practice.

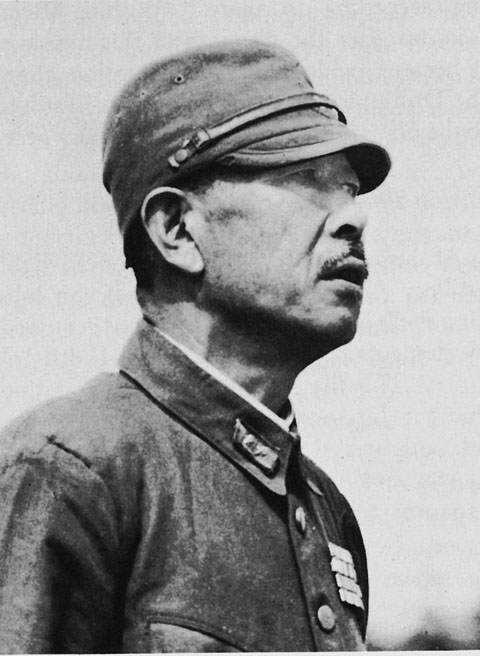
Lieutenant General Hatazō Adachi of the Eighteenth Army

In order to uphold the Senjinkun military code, it was considered extremely dishonourable to become an enemy prisoner in Japan at the time, even in a situation as desperate as the one faced by the Japanese Army in New Guinea. In the Japanese Army Penal Code, commanding officers ordering their troops to surrender was treated as a form of desertion, and even when troops gave their all in battle, surrender was still punishable by six months' imprisonment (article 41). Lieutenant General Hatazō Adachi, commander of the 18th Army, also gave an order on 18 March 1945, telling his soldiers that they should under no circumstances bring upon themselves the shame of being taken prisoner.

As a result, examples of the Japanese Army surrendering as a group are extremely rare. Apart from Takenaga's unit, the only other examples of group surrender by the Japanese Army in the Pacific War were two other groups in New Guinea that are discussed below, and the Army Naval Raiding Squadron, commanded by Umezawa and defending Zamami Island, in the Battle of Okinawa. Takenaga's unit was not the first example. In May, 1905, at the Battle of Mukden in the Russo-Japanese War, where all 42 survivors of a company of the 49th Infantry Regiment of the 1st Division were taken prisoner.

There was also a trend among the Australian Army to kill Japanese soldiers who attempted to surrender. There was an unspoken agreement among front-line Australian soldiers to kill all Japanese soldiers without taking any prisoners, and these actions were given tacit consent from the Australian command.

== Incident ==
From March to April 1945, the 239th Infantry Regiment of the 41st Division, assigned to the Eighteenth Army of the Imperial Japanese Army, was engaged in hostilities with the Australian Army in eastern New Guinea. The Australians were pursuing them through the southern Torricelli Mountains, near Aitape, on the north coast. According to the records of the 41st Division, the 2nd Battalion, commanded by Takenaga and comprising around 50 soldiers, decided to head west, separating themselves from their regiment, who were retreating to the east. According to notes made by a sergeant major in the battalion, the main force of the regiment retreated without giving them any notice, after which they thought that they had been abandoned and decided to fend for themselves.

In the middle of April, the 12th, according to a villager, around 45 of Takenaga's men raided Tau, a village of only a few houses, in order to find food. Villagers armed with throwing spears and hand grenades attacked the soldiers as they searched, which caused them to retaliate. The villagers quickly retreated, but the soldiers and the villagers each suffered two fatalities. The Japanese soldiers left Tau the next morning, but remained in the area.

The Australian Army learned of the presence of the Japanese troops through reports from police and villagers, and on 16 April they dispatched a platoon from the 2/5th Battalion, led by Lieutenant C. H. Miles, to deal with them. On 24 April, Miles' platoon came into contact with Takenaga's battalion, and two Japanese soldiers were killed after the two sides exchanged fire.

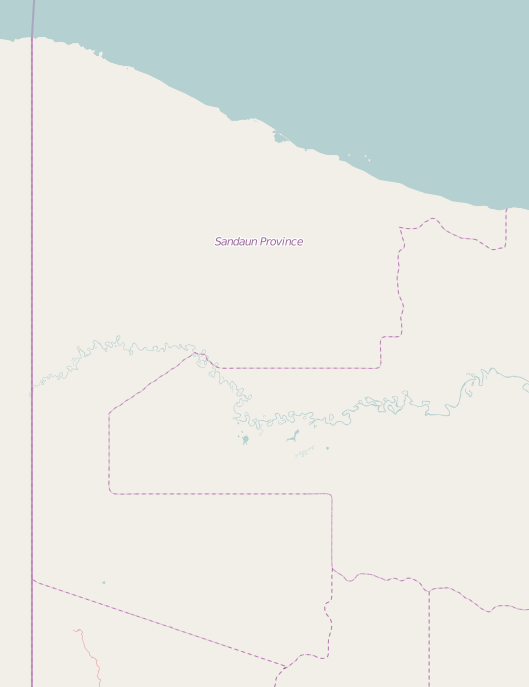
The location of Wormgrer village, the site of the surrender, in modern-day Sandaun Province, Papua New Guinea.

Takenaga's troops managed to shake off pursuit by the Australians, but decided that they would surrender. They took a leaflet containing a notice of surrender that one of the soldiers had been carrying, added some conditions underneath in English, tied it to a pole for the Australians to find, and left the area. Scouts from Miles' platoon then found the leaflet and brought it back with them. On 2 May, the Australian platoon spotted Takenaga's unit near Womgrer village, and asked a native to help them make contact.

Two truce bearers from the Japanese side came to the Australians to negotiate. The following day, Takenaga's unit surrendered at Womgrer and were disarmed. At the time of surrender, Takenaga's unit consisted of 42 men: five officers (including Takenaga), four warrant officers, and 33 non-commissioned officers and soldiers. They were equipped with five light machine guns, 17 rifles, five pistols, and 750 rounds of ammunition. The prisoners, escorted by Miles' platoon, marched for three days in an orderly fashion to Maprik Airport, and were then transported to Aitape.

The other Japanese forces thought that Takenaga's unit had gotten lost, and attempted to search for them, but learned of their surrender through propaganda posters distributed by the Australian Army.

=== Theories about the decision to surrender ===
There are two theories about the process that led Takenaga's unit to the decision to surrender. The first is that all of the members of the unit were involved in the decision, and the second is that only the officers were involved.

According to Ikuhiko Hata and Fumio Takahashi, whom Hata depended on for his research, after the battalion commanders agreed to surrender, the other soldiers in Takenaga's unit were assembled to see whether they would agree with the plan. Takahashi and Hata say that according to one of the surviving company commanders, after being told that the surrender was an order from Takenaga, those in favour were asked to raise their hands. When around half of the soldiers did not raise their hands, they were issued hand grenades and told that they should choose their own fate, a Japanese euphemism for suicide. After this, all of the soldiers agreed to the surrender plan.

An opposing point of view is held by Kiyohiko Satō, who says that only the battalion commanders were asked whether they agreed to the plan, and that the rest of the soldiers were not given a choice. According to Satō, the witnesses mentioned by Hata and Takahashi denied being interviewed on the subject at all. Furthermore, from freshly conducted interviews and from the sergeant major's notes, Satō infers that only the officers and warrant officers were involved in the decision to surrender, and that the other soldiers only received an order. (Note: According to Satō, when he approached Takahashi about the circumstances of his research, Takahashi falsely claimed that the witnesses he cited had since died, and said that his article in the journal Rekishi to Jinbutsu (History and People) had contained a certain amount of dramatisation.)

== Aftermath ==
Takenaga's unit were held in Aitape for around one month, before being broken up and sent to prison camps in Lae and in Australia, where they received good treatment. They were all interrogated, and in particular, Lieutenant Colonel Takenaga was transported to Manila for a detailed interrogation. As well as giving character information about the commanders of the 18th Army, Takenaga gave his opinion of how the Allies should deal with Emperor Hirohito: "If the Emperor is killed then the Japanese people will resist until the bitter end, but if there is an order from the Emperor then they will probably surrender peacefully."

In preparation for interrogation, the soldiers in Takenaga's unit had invented false personal and unit names before their surrender, but from documents seized in Wewak District the Australian Army recognised these as falsehoods. Some of the prisoners also helped with translation of seized documents and with propaganda broadcasts urging the Japanese Army to surrender.

After Takenaga's surrender, the 18th Army continued to fight in New Guinea until the end of the war on 15 August 1945. To replace Takenaga's unit, the 2nd Battalion of the 239th Infantry Regiment was reformed with new members. (Note: On paper, the reformed battalion consisted of the battalion headquarters, two infantry companies, and one machine-gun company. In practice, it was on the same scale as Takenaga's unit: around one platoon's worth of soldiers with only one heavy machine gun.) In August 1945, right before the end of the war, two companies from the reformed 2nd Battalion successively surrendered to the Australians. According to Australian Army records, 12 soldiers and their captain were captured on 10 August, and 16 soldiers and their captain were captured on 11 August. The reasons are said to include the Australian Army's solicitation for the Japanese forces' surrender, the precedent set by Takenaga's unit, and the fact that they had been ordered to defend their positions to the death. The survival rate of the 18th Army after the Battle of Driniumor River was only 25%, a figure significantly lower than the figure of 84% for Takenaga's unit. Of the 50 who survived Driniumor, 42 survived the war.

The surrender of Takenaga's unit was seen as an extremely dishonourable act by the Japanese Army. Upon learning of it, Lieutenant General Adachi strongly reprimanded the commanders of the 41st Division, and prayed to the emperor, while shedding tears, apologising for his lack of virtue. Even after the war, Takenaga was mostly considered a disgrace, and it was a long time before any light was shone on the Takenaga incident. While Takenaga's surrender was recorded in Dai Yonjūichi Nyū Ginia Sakusenshi (History of the 41st Division's New Guinea Operation), compiled by people associated with the 41st Division, and in Senshi Sōsho, a military history of the Pacific War published by the Defense Agency, there were also histories that recorded the event as though Takenaga's unit had been wiped out.

Awareness of the incident gradually increased after the publication of Fumio Takahashi's article in 1986, but even as of 2009 there were still military personnel who denied that the surrender occurred. For example, in a 2009 interview for NHK, Masao Horie, who was a staff officer for the 18th Army and a major at the time of the incident, said, "Up until now I have never heard of anything like a surrender, and I believe that there were no soldiers who surrendered. If it's true that there was a commander who surrendered, then it is a shame."

The former members of Takenaga's unit were repatriated at the end of the war, along with prisoners from other units. Many of them did not join veterans' associations, did not take any interviews, and lived the rest of their lives quietly. Takenaga worked as a private labourer, and died of illness in 1967. He did not suffer any particular discrimination from his former classmates in the Imperial Japanese Army Academy, and they attended his funeral.

== See also ==
- Japanese prisoners of war in World War II
- Cowra breakout

== Bibliography ==
- NHK "Sensō Shōgen" Project (2009). Shōgen Kiroku: Heishi-tachi no Sensō 3 [Witness Records: The Soldiers' War 3] (in Japanese). NHK. ISBN 978-4140813447.
- Satō, Kiyohiko (2003). Dotanba ni Okeru Ningen no Kenkyū: Nyū Ginia Yami no Senseki [Researching Man's Last Moments: The Dark Battlefields of New Guinea] (in Japanese). Fuyō Shobō. ISBN 978-4829503348.
- Tanaka, Yuki (1993). Shirarezaru Sensō Hanzai: Nihongun wa Ōsutoraria ni Nani o Shita ka [Unknown War Crimes: What the Japanese Army did to Australia] (in Japanese). Ōtsuki Shoten. ISBN 978-4272520305.
- Hata, Ikuhiko; Takahashi, Fumio (1998). "Dai 19-sho: Nihongun Zendai Mimon no Shūdan Tōkō" [Chapter 19: A Group Surrender, Unprecedented in the Japanese Army]. Nihonjin Horyo: Hakusukinoe kara Shiberia Yokuryū made [Japanese Prisoners of War: From the Battle of Baekgang to Siberian Internment] (in Japanese). Vol. 2. Hara Shobō. ISBN 978-4562030729.
- Military Archives, National Institute for Defense Studies, Japanese Defense Agency (1975). Minami Taiheiyō Rikugun Sakusen 5: Aitape, Puriaka, Rabauru [The Army's Strategy in the South Pacific 5: Aitape, Puriata, Rabaul]. Military History Series (in Japanese). Asagumo News. ASIN B000J87R9A.
- Fukiura, Tadamasa (1990). Horyo no Bunmeishi [History of Prisoners of War]. Shinchō Sensho (in Japanese). ISBN 978-4106003875.
- Long, Gavin (1963). "Volume VII: The Final Campaigns". Australia in the War of 1939–1945. Series 1: Army, Australian War Memorial. Archived from the original on 25 May 2009.
