= Avram Miller =

American businessman (born 1945)

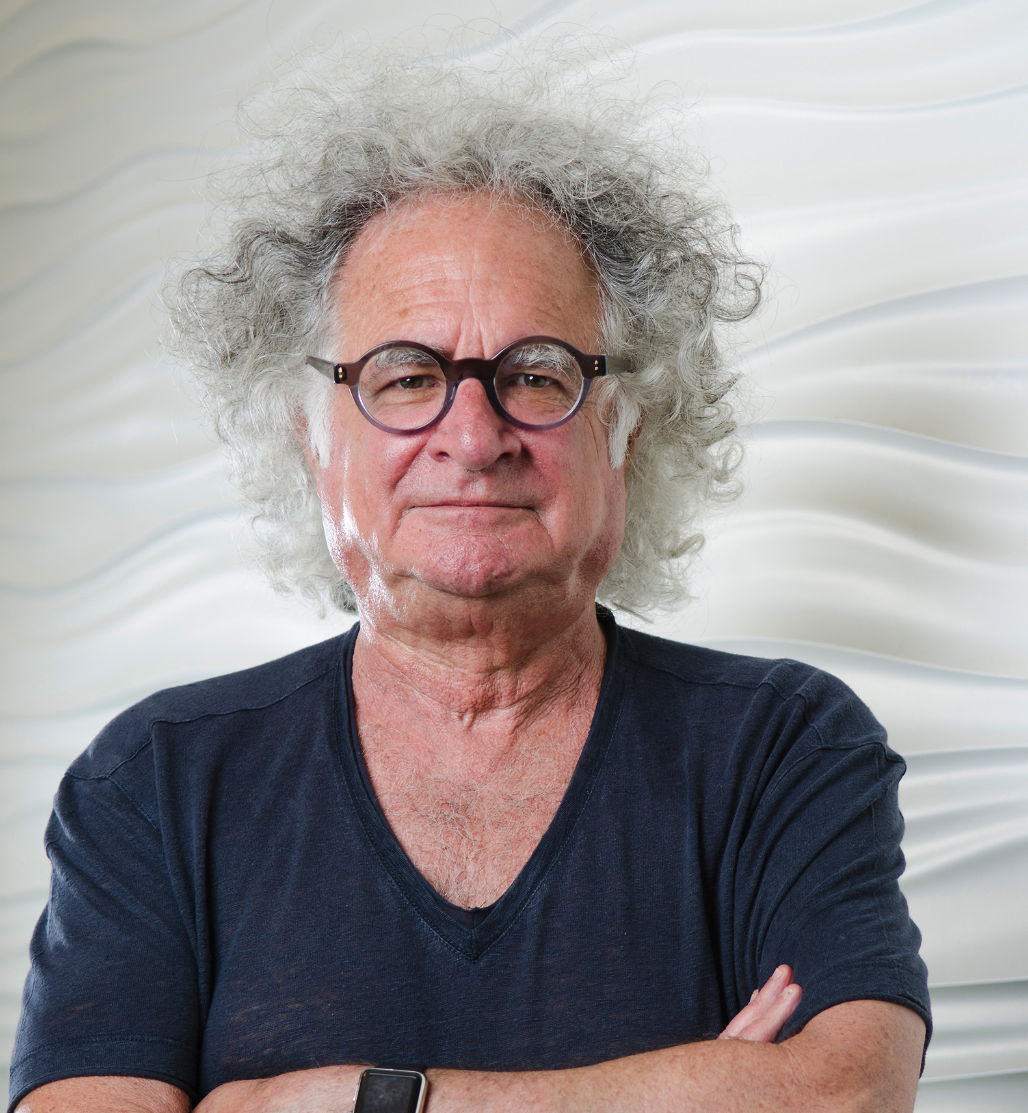
- Born: January 27, 1945 (age 81); San Francisco, California, U.S.
- Education: Drew School
- Occupations: Corporate Vice President, Intel (retired 1999)
- Website: avrammiller.com

Avram Miller (born January 27, 1945) is an American businessman, corporate venture capitalist, scientist and technologist. He was vice president, business development for Intel Corporation (1984–1999). With Leslie L. Vadász, he co-founded Intel Capital. He led Intel's initiative to help create and expand residential broadband Internet access.

After leaving Intel, he founded The Avram Miller Company, a consulting firm for technology companies. Miller has served as a senior advisor to Lazard, and has served as a director of various companies including CMGI, World Online, PCCW, and entertainment companies including Maxis and King World Productions.

Miller was the founding chair of Plugged In, a non-profit computer literacy program for underserved urban youth (1992–1999), a senior advisor to Equal Access (1999–2012) and a trustee of the California Institute of the Arts (CalArts) (1998–2002).

== Early life and education ==
Avram Miller is from a San Francisco middle-class Jewish family. After graduating from Drew School, a private high school there in 1963, Miller joined the United States Merchant Marine as a steward. He was active in both the civil rights and anti-war movements.

== Career ==
=== Langley Porter (1966-1969) ===
Toward the end of 1966, Miller began work at the Langley Porter Institute, University of California San Francisco Medical School, under Joseph Kamiya, PhD, who was a pioneer in the study of biofeedback. Miller developed much of the equipment that was used in this research.

=== Thoraxcenter (1969-1974) ===
In early 1969, Miller joined cardiologist Paul Hugenholtz, who was starting a new cardiovascular institute at Erasmus University Rotterdam, called The Thoraxcenter. His primary task was to build a computer department.

=== Mennen-Greatbatch (1974-1979) ===
Moving with his family to Israel in 1974, Miller joined medical technology manufacturer Mennen-Greatbatch (now Mennen Medical) as founder and director of their computer division. He also was named Adjunct Associate Professor at Tel Aviv University School of Medicine, working in the Department of Cardiology under Professor Henry N. Neufeld.

=== Digital Equipment Corporation (1979-1983) ===
Returning to the United States in 1979, Miller joined the Central Engineering Department of Digital Equipment Corporation. Miller managed the group responsible for hardware development and support of low-end computers.

A year later, Ken Olsen, Digital's founder and CEO, chose Miller to head a new group dedicated to developing the company's entry into the personal computer market. The products were known as the Professional Series. The Professional 350, introduced at the 1982 National Computer Conference in Houston, TX, ran a multiprocessing operating system, a fully bitmapped display, and had built-in Ethernet capability.

=== Franklin Computer (1983-1984) ===
In 1983, Miller became Chief Operating Officer at Franklin Computer Corporation (now Franklin Electronic Publishers, Inc.), an early-stage Apple II clone manufacturer. Miller was later named president.

Under Miller, Franklin reached $80 million in sales, but a legal battle with Apple hindered it greatly. Miller left Franklin in April 1984.

=== Intel (1984-1999) and the birth of Intel Capital ===
Miller joined Intel Corporation in August 1984, initially working with "The System Group," a division that developed computer systems. Miller reported to Les Vadász, who had led the company's efforts to develop its first microprocessor. Miller focused on mergers, joint ventures, strategic partnerships and minority investments.

In 1988, Miller was named Vice President, Business Development, and later was elected Corporate Vice President by the Intel board.

With the support of Intel's CEO Andy Grove, Vadász and Miller created the Corporative Business Development group (CBD), later renamed Intel Capital. Intel Capital became a successful corporative venture group in the technology sector.

Miller's group was an investor in Mark Cuban's Broadcast.com, internet infrastructure and security services company Verisign, communications semiconductor maker Broadcom, interactive publications innovator LAUNCH Media, the web-hosting service GeoCities, the tech media site CNET and broadband network provider Covad (now part of MegaPath Corporation). Miller's group also invested in CMGI (now ModusLink Global Solutions, Inc.) and PCCW.

== Development of Residential Broadband ==
In 1992, Miller was asked by Andy Grove to be the Intel point person working with Microsoft to develop a number of consumer initiatives. They sought to develop an interactive set-top box for the cable television industry. This project also involved General Instrument (GI) owned Jerrold, a large supplier of set-tops. Working with Intel and Microsoft was GI CTO Matt Miller (no relation).

By the end of 1992, it was determined that an interactive set-top box would be too expensive. With Matt Miller, Avram Miller recognized much of the digital TV technology could be used for high-speed residential broadband connections. GI and Intel began to develop both cable modems and the head-end equipment used as a gateway to the Internet.

Speaking to this faster Internet access in 1996, Miller predicted:

"It's not about playing cards, it's about talking. It's known as social computing, people interacting through the personal computer.

"And I see this as a major driver to the use of PCs."

"This will make the PC indispensable to our lives and it will change the way we communicate," he said. "PCs will be on all the time."

Miller organized the first major trials of cable modems with Comcast and Viacom (which then owned a cable business). In 1993, Intel demonstrated working cable modems at The Western Cable Show in Anaheim, CA.

Miller got such companies as America Online (AOL) and Prodigy to participate in the broadband trials. Intel then provided the key specification to CableLabs (the research arm of the cable industry), which became the DOCSIS (Data Over Cable Service Interface Specification) standard.

Because the cable industry did not have the technical capabilities to manage an internet business, Miller conceived of a company that would provide these services, and convinced the venture group Kleiner, Perkins, Caufield & Byers (KPCB, also known as Kleiner Perkins) to work with the cable industry to create the company @Home Network. Intel would also invest in this high-speed cable Internet service provider.

In addition to the development of broadband cable, Miller oversaw Intel's activities to create high-speed DSL (digital subscriber line) Internet access, working extensively with telephone companies.

== The Avram Miller Company ==
Miller left Intel in April 1999 to start The Avram Miller Company, a strategy and business development group providing services to Internet companies internationally.

In addition, Miller served on the boards of many public (CMGI, World Online, and PCCW) and private companies (Heavy.com), and was a senior advisor to Lazard Frères & Co. (now the Lazard Group LLC). Miller currently serves as a senior advisor to Sheba Hospital in Israel as well as The Lerner Research Institute of the Cleveland Clinic.

In 2003, Miller was ranked number eight on the Forbes Midas List of the top 100 tech investors.

== Personal life ==
Two adult children from his first marriage. Married to Deborah Neasi-Miller in 2003. They reside in Italy.
