= Kenneth Lamott =

American writer (1923–1979)

- Born: Kenneth Church Lamott; April 8, 1923; Tokyo, Japan
- Died: August 18, 1979 (aged 56); Bolinas, California, U.S.
- Occupations: Novelist; non-fiction writer; essayist; screenwriter
- Notable work: Science in Action
- Children: Anne Lamott

Kenneth Church Lamott (April 8, 1923 – August 18, 1979) was an American writer.

== Early life and education ==
Lamott spent his childhood in Japan, where his father was a Presbyterian missionary. The family returned to the United States in 1938 after Lamott had spent two years at the American School in Japan. Lamott graduated from Montclair High School in Montclair, New Jersey, and began studies in engineering at Yale in 1940. He left during World War II and joined the Navy with the rank of Lieutenant. After attending the US Navy Japanese/Oriental Language School at the University of Colorado at Boulder, he was assigned to interrogate Japanese prisoners of war. Following the War, he returned to Yale, where he received a degree in English. He married Dorothy Wyles in 1946, with whom he had three children. He worked for the State Department until 1951, then moved to California, where he taught part-time at San Quentin Prison while writing his first book.

== Career ==
Lamott's first novel, The Stockade, was about a group of Marines guarding prisoners confined within a stockade, and their interaction with the indigenous people on an Island in the Pacific as the war ends.

Lamott wrote other novels and non-fiction books. He also had other projects, Killing the Whale, which was not published and The Great Big New Rich, which was published in 1970. He wrote many articles for Harper's, Horizon magazine, The New York Times Magazine, The New Yorker, Newsweek, and Yale Review. He also wrote for Contact magazine, which he edited in the early 1960s. He was a screenwriter of television scripts, including Science in Action.

== Personal life and death ==
During the 1960s and 1970s, Lamott lived in Tiburon, California and, in his later years, Bolinas, California. He divorced in 1974 and died of brain cancer in Bolinas on August 18, 1979.

He was the father of American novelist and non-fiction writer Anne Lamott.

== Bibliography ==
=== Novels ===
- The Stockade (1952, Little Brown)
- The White Sand of Shirahama (1954, Little Brown)
- The Bastille Day Parade (1967, D. McKay Co.)

=== Non-fiction ===
- Chronicles of San Quentin: the biography of a prison. (1961, D. McKay Co.)
- Who killed Mr. Crittenden?: being a true account of the notorious murder that stunned San Francisco--the Laura D. Fair case (1963, D. McKay Co.)
- The Moneymakers (1969, Little Brown)
- Anti-California; report from our first parafascist state (1971, Little Brown)
- Escape from Stress: How to stop killing yourself (1974, Putnam). ISBN 978-0-399-11389-5.

=== Newspaper and magazine articles ===
- "In the Matter Of H. Bruce Franklin," The New York Times, January 23, 1972
