= Featherston prisoner of war camp =

WWII prisoner-of-war camp in New Zealand

Coordinates: 41.118615°S 175.356065°E

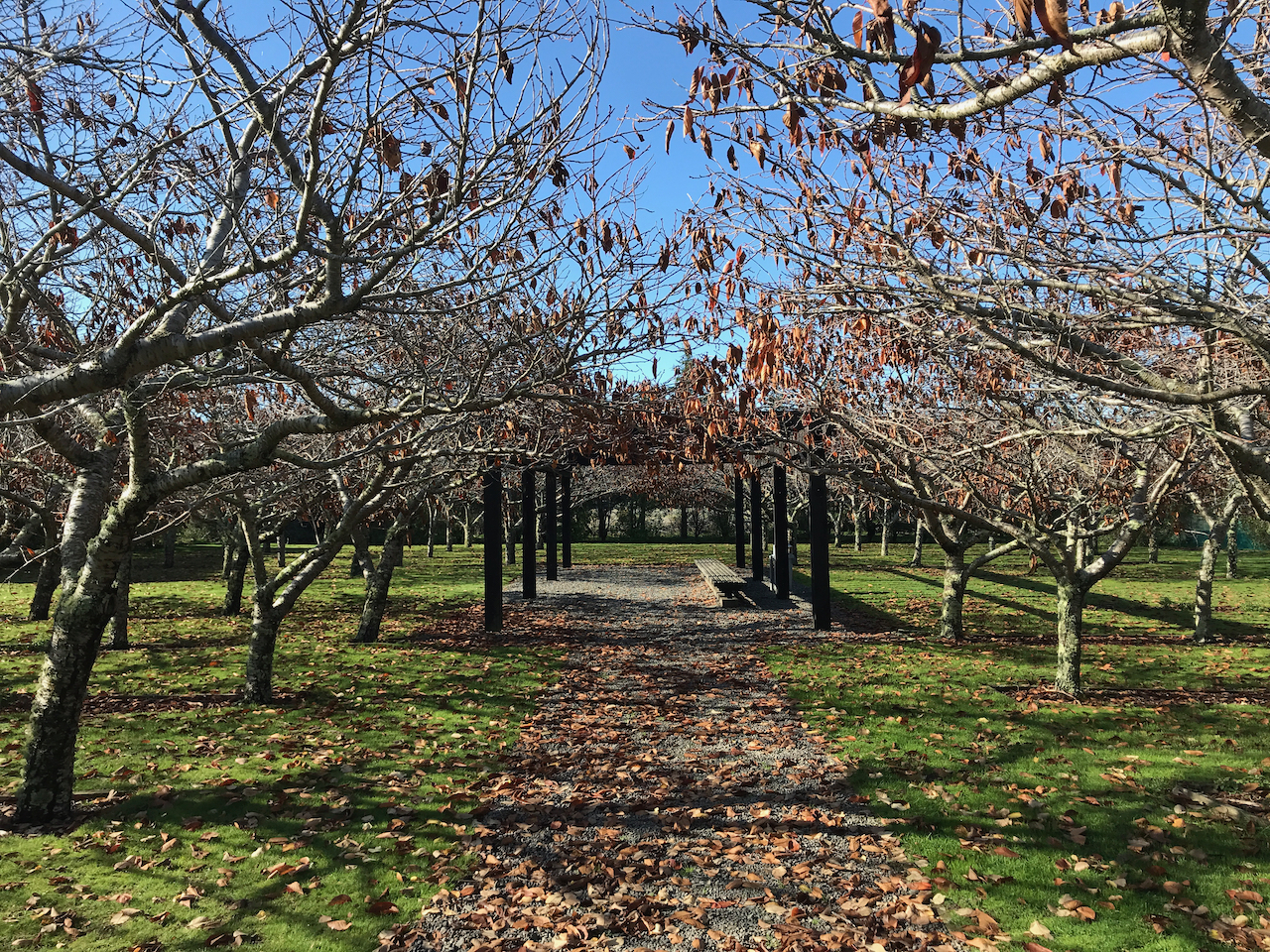
Cherries at the WWII POW memorial, Featherston

Featherston prisoner of war camp was a camp for captured Japanese soldiers during World War II at Featherston, New Zealand, notorious for a 1943 incident in which 48 Japanese and one New Zealander were killed. The camp had been established during World War I as a military training camp and had also been used as an internment camp from 1918 to 1920, when 14 German internees remained there.

== Background ==
=== Second World War ===
Featherston Military Camp in Wairarapa, New Zealand was used to train soldiers for the New Zealand Army. After the Armistice of 11 November 1918, Chief of General Staff, Colonel Charles Gibbon, found himself rushing to Featherston Military Camp, where 5,000 New Zealand troops were in a state of mutiny over being still enlisted and mobilized. The commanders gave in to some of the soldiers’ demands around demobilisation.

=== Japanese POW camp ===
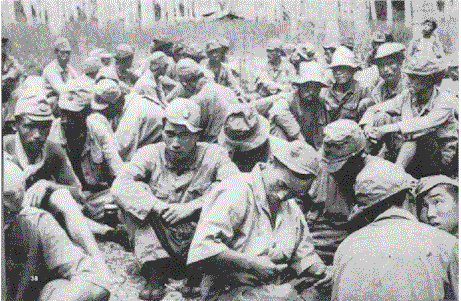
Japanese POWs at Guadalcanal

At the request of the United States, in September 1942 the Army camp at Featherston was re-established as a POW camp. The staff selected to watch over the POWs were those that were too young or too old to serve overseas or that were unable to go for medical reasons. These men were only given a vague idea of what their role was to be and were not given any training or instruction in how to interact with prisoners of war. The first commandant was Major R. H. Perrett. He was succeeded by Lieutenant Colonel D.H. Donaldson in mid December 1942. Medical services were provided by a 40-bed hospital, which saw its first patient on 24 April 1943. In November, a further 250 prisoners arrived at the camp. In total 868 Japanese soldiers and paramilitary personnel taken prisoner in the South Pacific were imprisoned at the camp, many of them conscripts. The senior Japanese officer at the camp was Lieutenant Sakujiro Kamikubo of the Imperial Japanese Navy.

The prisoners consisted of two groups; the larger group were Koreans and members of forced labour units who had been working at Henderson Field (Guadalcanal), and the smaller group consisted of about 240 officers and other ranks of the Imperial Japanese Army and Navy (including Airmen from both branches). About half of this second group were crew from the Japanese cruiser Furutaka, which was sunk during the Battle of Cape Esperance. The 19 surviving crew of the destroyer Akatsuki were also imprisoned here.

== Camp ==
The camp was divided into four compounds, with Koreans and labourers in one, members of the Japanese Armed Forces in the second, and the officers and others in the third and fourth compounds. The prisoners lived in small army huts, with eight men to one hut.

The officers were given New Zealand Army battledress, dyed blue, and a New Zealand Army felt hat, also dyed blue. The other ranks were given blue-dyed World War One uniforms with a diamond-shaped khaki patch sewn on the back of the jacket and the front and back of the right thigh of the trousers. Boots were also provided.

== Featherston Incident ==
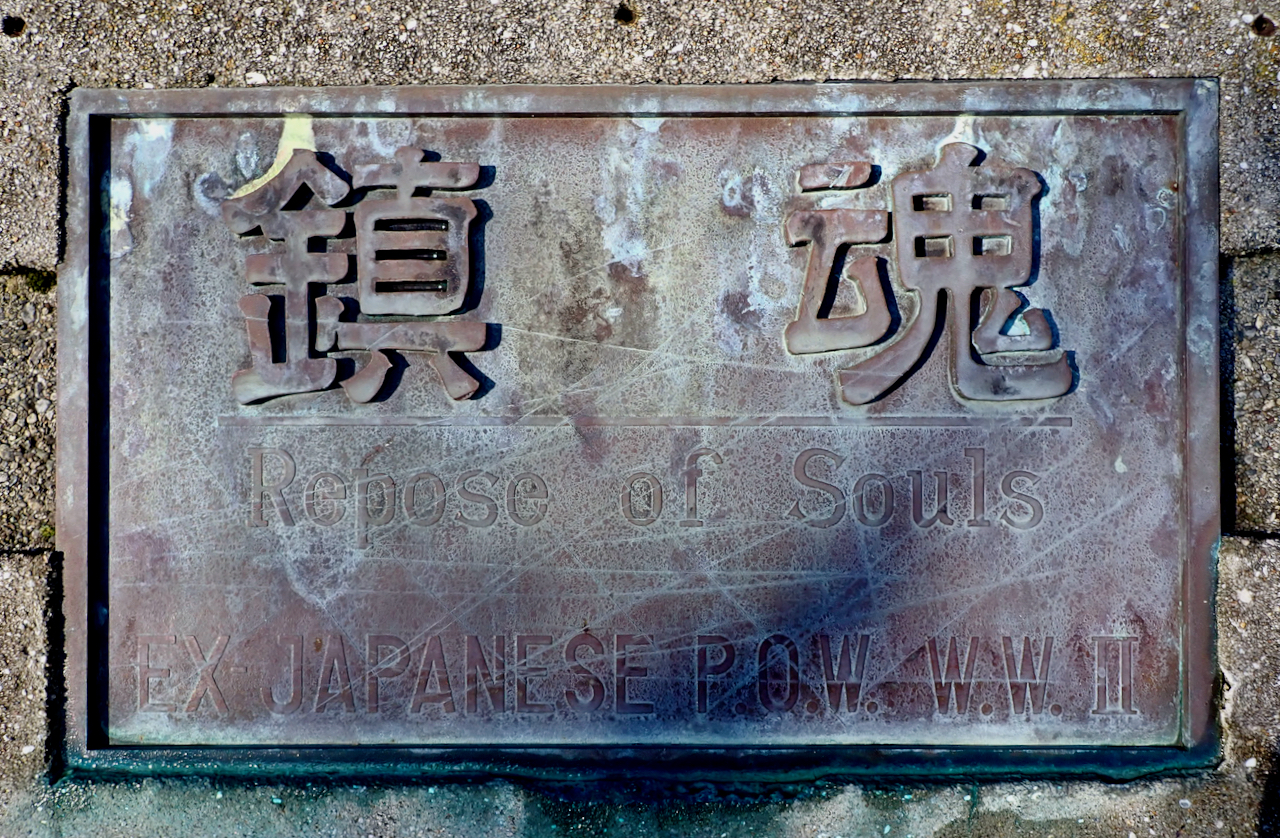
Memorial plaque at Featherston WWII POW camp

The camp's most infamous event was on 25 February 1943 during a sit-in of about 240 prisoners in No. 2 compound, who refused to work. Then followed two hours of negotiations to get the men to work. The exact sequence of events is disputed, but one of the Japanese officers was forcibly removed and the adjutant threatened the remaining one with his revolver, and fired a shot near him and then fired another warning shot which hit and wounded Japanese Sub-Lieutenant Adachi. This led to the prisoners throwing stones and then reportedly rushing the guards, who opened fire with rifles, sub-machine guns and pistols. A burst of fire of 15–30 seconds (accounts differ) killed 31 prisoners with a further 17 dying of wounds at hospital (totaling 48 killed) with 74 wounded. On the New Zealand side, a ricochet from a burst of the gunfire killed Private Walter Pelvin, and several other soldiers were injured by rocks. At Greytown Hospital a special ward was set up to look after the injured prisoners. The windows were blacked out and all staff dealing with the prisoners were replaced afterwards to prevent the incident from leaking out to the public.

The Red Cross had been allowed to visit the camp and pronounced the conditions normal. A military court of inquiry erroneously put the majority of blame for the incident on the prisoners, but found that cultural differences contributing to the incident needed to be addressed. Among the issues was that the Japanese did not know that under the 1929 Geneva Convention on Prisoners of War, which Japan had signed but not ratified, that compulsory work was allowed.

The death at Greytown from wounds received at a prisoner-of war camp of Private Pelvin was reported in newspapers.

== Camp life ==
Each of the four compounds had its own leader and they in turn had assistants under them. The leaders were responsible for their compound's order and cleanliness, along with organising personnel for specific tasks. The leaders also communicated any of the prisoners' complaints or concerns to the camp commander.

The prisoners constructed a memorial inscribed in Japanese to their faithful dead in front of one of the huts. The memorial was described as a very fine piece of work and made of reddish stone. The base was made of stones inlayed in concrete with a rough oblong block of stone with a smoothed face panel as its tablet. This panel had the Japanese inscription.

Outside most huts the prisoners cultivated small gardens, growing flowers and vegetables. Other work included furniture-making and shifting rocks. Some prisoners made a tennis court in one area, levelling the ground and making the nets and rackets from scrap materials. Mahjong sets were also carved from wood. Movies were shown about once a fortnight for entertainment and some of the prisoners put on traditional costume plays in the recreation huts.

The prisoners did not wear their shoes or boots in the huts, but constructed small storage areas inside the hut entrances for them. Some made curtains for the lower bunks from scrap material and some made small lockers for their personal effects.

== Repatriation ==
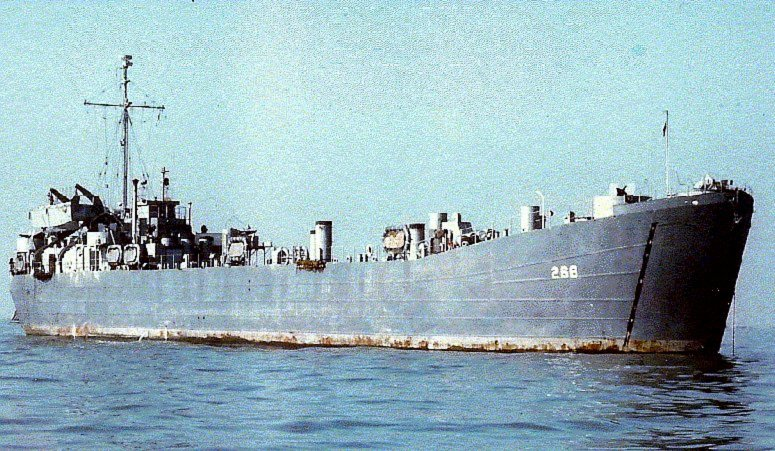
Tank landing ship like LST-273 or 275

As the end of the war neared, the prisoners began to worry about their future position in Japanese society. A Press article stated that to their own people they were considered dead.

In September 1944, the prisoners told a neutral inspector that provision needed to be made for them to return as honourable citizens, or that they be given asylum on a Pacific island. They said if something could not be done, mass suicide might result. After the end of the war they also worried that they could be attacked in New Zealand over the conditions in Japanese prisoner of war camps.

The prisoners were transported in two trains from Featherston to Wellington and left on 30 December 1945 for Japan on two large American tank landing ships, LST-273 and LST-275, which were under Lieutenant Commander R P Rudolph. The ships had an eventful journey running into bad storms, with LST-273 having problems with its main engine, on its journey to Apra Harbor, Guam where the prisoners were taken to POW camps to be prepared for return to Japan. The ships had stopped at Guadalcanal on the return journey, where the Japanese held a ceremony to remember their dead. They eventually disembarked at Uraga, Kanagawa on 4 February 1946.

== Legacy ==
Cherry trees were planted as a memorial at the site. In 2019, students from Kuranui College attended a special memorial to remember the 48 Japanese prisoners and the New Zealand guard who lost their lives. A Television programme called Heritage Rescue did an episode about the Featherston incident.

== See also ==
- List of disasters in New Zealand by death toll
- List of massacres in New Zealand
- Cowra breakout
- Japanese prisoners of war in World War II
