= Alexander Wang (designer) =

American fashion designer (born 1983)

- Wang at the Museum of Chinese in America’s Legacy Awards Gala in 2026
- Born: December 26, 1983 (age 42); San Francisco, California, U.S.
- Education: Parsons School of Design
- Occupation: Fashion designer
- Label: Alexander Wang

Chinese name
- Chinese: 王大仁
Transcriptions
Standard Mandarin
- Hanyu Pinyin: Wáng Dàrén
- Website: alexanderwang.com

Alexander Wang (born December 26, 1983) is an American fashion designer. Wang launched his eponymous fashion brand in 2005 and came to prominence after being awarded the CFDA/Vogue Fashion Fund in 2008. He is known for his urban-inspired designs and use of black.

From November 2012 through July 2015, Wang was creative director at Balenciaga.

== Early life and education ==
Wang was born on December 26, 1983, to Taiwanese American mother Ying Wang in San Francisco, California, where he was raised with his brother, Dennis, and sister, Theresa. Despite speculation, Wang has noted that he does not speak Mandarin Chinese.

He attended elementary and middle school at the Harker School in San Jose, California. He spent ninth grade as a boarding student at the Stevenson School in Pebble Beach, California. Subsequently, Wang attended and graduated from the Drew School in San Francisco. At 15 years old, Wang took part in a summer design program at Central Saint Martins.

At age 18, Wang moved to New York City to attend Parsons School of Design. He left his program after two years to begin his professional career and did not graduate.

== Career ==
In 2005, after two years at Parsons, Wang decided to pursue the launch of his own fashion label, which debuted with a predominantly knitwear collection. In Fall 2007, Wang presented a complete women's ready-to-wear collection on the New York catwalk for the first time. He won the CFDA/Vogue Fashion Fund in 2008, an honor accompanied by a $20,000 award to expand one's business. That same year, he launched his first handbag collection.

After designing a Fall 2008 collection using black as the predominant color, he designed his Spring 2009 collection using bright colors such as orange, dusty purple, aqua and hot pink. Following this, he reverted to using mainly black fabrics. Wang's first flagship store opened in SoHo, in lower Manhattan, on February 17, 2011. Some have noted that the brand has helped to rejuvenate an otherwise dissolving area into fashion's Lower Manhattan epicenter.

On November 30, 2012, Wang was named creative director at Balenciaga, after Nicolas Ghesquière's departure, to oversee the women's and men's ready-to-wear and accessories lines. His debut Fall–Winter 2013 Balenciaga collection was shown in February 2013 at the Balenciaga salons in Paris at 10 avenue George V. He created a collection for the fashion retailer H&M that launched on November 6, 2014. On July 31, 2015, he left Balenciaga.

In 2016, Wang became the CEO and chairman of the Wang brand, succeeding his mother, Ying Wang, and sister-in-law, Aimee Wang. Later that year, he was awarded $90 million in damages after successfully suing over 45 defendants operating 459 websites that sold counterfeit goods bearing the brand name, although the reward was mostly symbolic, as neither Wang nor the brand were likely to ever receive the amount. Wang hosted a 2016 New York Fashion Week show. In 2018, he launched a capsule collection with the condom brand Trojan with the tagline 'Protect your Wang'.

=== The Wang Contemporary ===
In 2026, Wang and his mother, Ying Wang, co-founded The Wang Contemporary, a cultural organization in Chinatown, Manhattan, dedicated to supporting and presenting Asian and Asian-American creativity across art, design, music and performance.

The organization is housed at 58 Bowery, the landmarked former Citizens Savings Bank building. Wang and his mother acquired the building in 2025 for a reported $9.5 million, marking the first time in the building's century-long history that it came under Chinese-American ownership.

The Wang Contemporary made its public debut in February 2026 during Lunar New Year, opening with an installation by the Brooklyn-based art collective MSCHF.

== Awards and recognition ==
Wang was the winner of the 2008 Council of Fashion Designers of America (CFDA)/Vogue Fashion Fund Award. In 2009, he was recognized by his peers when he was announced as the winner of the Swarovski Womenswear Designer of the Year. Later that same year he was the recipient of the Swiss Textiles Award. Wang was celebrated again in 2010 with another Swarovski Designer of the Year Award, this time in the Accessory category. In 2011, GQ US acknowledged Wang as the Best Menswear Designer of the Year. That same year he also won the CFDA's Best Accessory Designer award.

In October 2013, Wang was honored with the 'Fashion Star' awarded by Fashion Group International. The award was presented to Wang by Hamish Bowles, European Editor-at-Large of Vogue US. In 2017, Wang was named one of HypeBeast's HB100, their top 100 influencers in the industry.

== Philanthropy and charitable work ==
Wang has participated in a number of charitable initiatives involving fashion, youth programs and the arts. In 2013, he collaborated with Samsung on limited-edition accessories to benefit Art Start, a New York nonprofit organization that uses the arts to support young people. The collaboration included the Wallie gym sack, created from drawings and images contributed by members of Wang's creative circle, with proceeds benefiting the organization.

In 2015, to mark the tenth anniversary of his fashion label, Wang partnered with the youth and social-change organization DoSomething on a collection of co-branded T-shirts and hoodies. Fifty percent of the proceeds from the collection were donated to the organization. The accompanying campaign was photographed by Steven Klein and featured figures from fashion, music and entertainment.

== Controversies ==
=== Sweatshop allegations ===
In February 2012, a lawsuit was filed against Wang, claiming that his company violated New York State labor laws, and that employees were mistreated. The 31 plaintiffs sought $50 million for each of nine charges, a total of $450 million. One of the workers, Wenyu Lu, claimed that he was "hospitalized for several days after he passed out at his work station because he was forced to work 25 hours straight without a break". Lu claimed that the 200-square-foot (19 m^{2}) office on Broadway was windowless and poorly ventilated, and that workers were being forced to work 16 hours or more without overtime or breaks; Lu's lawyer, Ming Hai, claimed that Lu was eventually fired on February 16 due to complaints about working conditions and applying for workers' compensation. A second worker, Flor Duante, also stated that she was fired after filing for workers' compensation, and that she had worked 90-hour weeks at Wang's factory.

On August 14, 2012, WWD reported that the lawsuit had been dismissed, with a spokesman for Wang stating that "We are gratified that this matter has been dismissed, as the allegations were unfounded and completely false". However, it was reported that both parties had agreed to a settlement with undisclosed terms.

=== Sexual assault allegations ===
Fashion industry whistleblower account Diet Prada and modeling industry watchdog account Shit Model Management published posts on Instagram on December 29, 2020, compiling accusations made on social media (TikTok, Twitter and Instagram) by people who said Wang sexually assaulted them.

Social media scrutiny ensued when male model Owen Mooney came forward, describing a 2017 incident where he was groped by Wang in a packed New York City nightclub, which was later reposted by Shit Model Management, leading others to come forward with similar stories. The posts amplified previous allegations from others such as New York-based DJ Nick Ward, who publicly accused Wang of groping him in a nightclub in 2017. Some claimed to have witnessed a victim being drugged by Wang, or being slipped ecstasy or other drugs themselves without their knowledge. There were also repeat allegations of victims, including several trans women, being groped or having their bodies or genitals exposed by Wang.

On December 31, 2020, Wang's representatives released a statement to various media outlets, with the designer denying all accusations of sexual assault and that he intended to "hold accountable whoever is responsible for originating these claims and viciously spreading them online." On January 1, 2021, The Guardian published other alleged accounts of sexual assault incidents from others, including transgender model and actor Gia Garison. On January 4, 2021, Wang issued an updated statement thanking those who had stood by him, while also assuring that he would "remain honest and transparent" throughout the investigation into the claims. The same day it was reported that Lisa Bloom would represent alleged victims of Wang.

He spoke with his accusers in 2022 and published an apology on Instagram. Bloom tweeted, "We acknowledge Mr. Wang's apology and we are moving forward."

== Personal life ==
Wang is gay and a supporter of the LGBTQ community. In 2018, Wang partnered with Trojan to release a limited-edition "Protect Your Wang" capsule collection in support of the LGBTQ community and to celebrate Pride.

He is well known for his party-going persona, having thrown a number of memorable parties, such as one thrown at a gas station in 2009 to celebrate his Spring 2010 collection, a party in 2019 to celebrate Wang's Bulgari x Alexander Wang collection, and parties held for New York Fashion Week.

Wang currently resides in New York City, with a number of residences in New York state, including in Westchester County.

== See also ==
- Chinese people in New York City
- LGBT culture in New York City
- List of LGBT people from New York City
- NYC Pride March
- Taiwanese people in New York City
