= Drew School =

Private high school in San Francisco, California

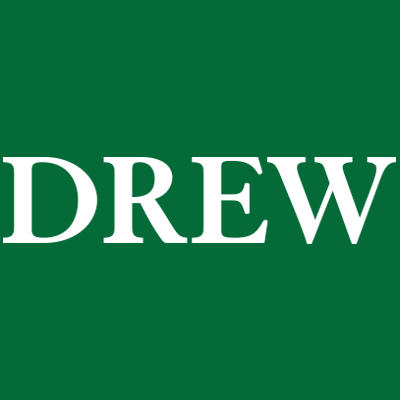
- 2901 California St., San Francisco, California

Information
- Type: Private, Coeducational
- Established: 1908
- Head of school: Saya McKenna
- Faculty: 31
- Enrollment: 300
- Student to teacher ratio: 10:1
- Campus type: Urban
- Colors: Green, silver
- Athletics: 21 teams, JV and Varsity
- Athletics conference: Bay Counties League – Central
- Mascot: Dragon
- Endowment: $2.2M
- Annual tuition: $66,800
- Newspaper: "2901"
- Website: http://www.drewschool.org/

Drew School is an independent, coeducational, college-preparatory high school located in San Francisco, California, United States. Since its founding, Drew has been distinctive for small classes, individualized instruction, and a mission of adapting education to each student.

== History ==
John Sheehan Drew founded Drew School in 1908 as a private tutoring school in San Francisco. Initially serving a single student, the school was created to provide individualized academic instruction for students who were not well served by traditional classroom models.

By 1911, the school had moved to its long-term location at 2901 California Street, at the corner of California and Broderick Streets in the Pacific Heights neighborhood.

Early accounts describe Drew as emphasizing small classes and personalized pacing. A 1926 article in the San Francisco Chronicle noted that the school offered both day and evening classes and served students preparing for university entrance as well as working adults.

Over time the institution evolved from a small coaching school into a fully accredited secondary school. In 1973, Drew School incorporated as a nonprofit organization governed by a board of trustees.

== Drew today ==
Drew School is accredited by the National Association of Independent Schools, the California Association of Independent Schools and the Western Association of Schools and Colleges.

Drew School emphasizes experiential and interdisciplinary education. The school's curriculum includes:

- Interdisciplinary courses combining humanities subjects;
- Experiential learning programs using the city of San Francisco as an extended classroom; and
- Arts programs including theater, music, photography, maker and visual arts.

== Campus ==
Drew underwent a complete renovation in 2001, designed by Perkins + Will; while also adding a 45,000-square-foot (4,200 m^{2}) attached performing arts wing known as the Cuddeback Wing, after Samuel Cuddeback III, who was head of school. The Cuddeback Wing was designed in 2011, and features a noted living wall designed by Patrick Blanc.

== Athletic achievements ==
- 2022 NCS Class A Championship, Track and Field - 100M, 200M
- 2022 BAC Championships, Track and Field - 100M, 200M
- 2016 NCS Sectional Championship, Boys Varsity Soccer
- 2016 NCS Sectional Championship, Girls Varsity Soccer

Fall sports

- Boys' soccer
- Girls' tennis
- Girls' volleyball
- Boys' cross-country
- Girls' cross-country

Winter sports

- Boys' basketball
- Girls' basketball
- Girls' soccer

Spring sports

- Baseball
- Swimming
- Track and field
- Badminton
- Boys' tennis
- Golf (Co-ed)

== Notable alumni ==
- Alexander Massialas (2012), Olympic fencer
- Alexander Wang (2002), fashion designer
- Anne Lamott (1971), writer
- Avram Miller (1963), corporate venture capitalist, scientist, technologist, author
- Mohammad Javad Zarif (1977), Iranian Minister of Foreign Affairs
- Tyson Vogel (1999), musician, band member of Two Gallants
- Zuzana Licko (1979), digital typeface pioneer
- Eric Rachmany (2002), guitarist of the band Rebelution

== See also ==
- San Francisco County high schools
