= Ralph Jones (soldier) =

Australian soldier, recipient of the George Cross (1900–1944)

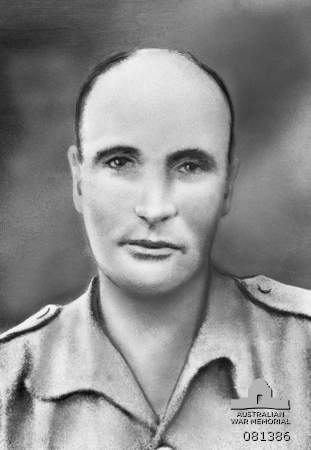
- Born: 26 September 1900; Gorleston-on-Sea area of Great Yarmouth, Norfolk, England, United Kingdom
- Died: 5 August 1944 (aged 43); Cowra, Australia
- Military career
- Allegiance: United Kingdom; Australia
- Branch: British Army; Australian Army
- Service years: 1918–20; 1942–44
- Rank: Private
- Conflicts: First World War; Second World War; Home Front; Cowra breakout †
- Awards: George Cross

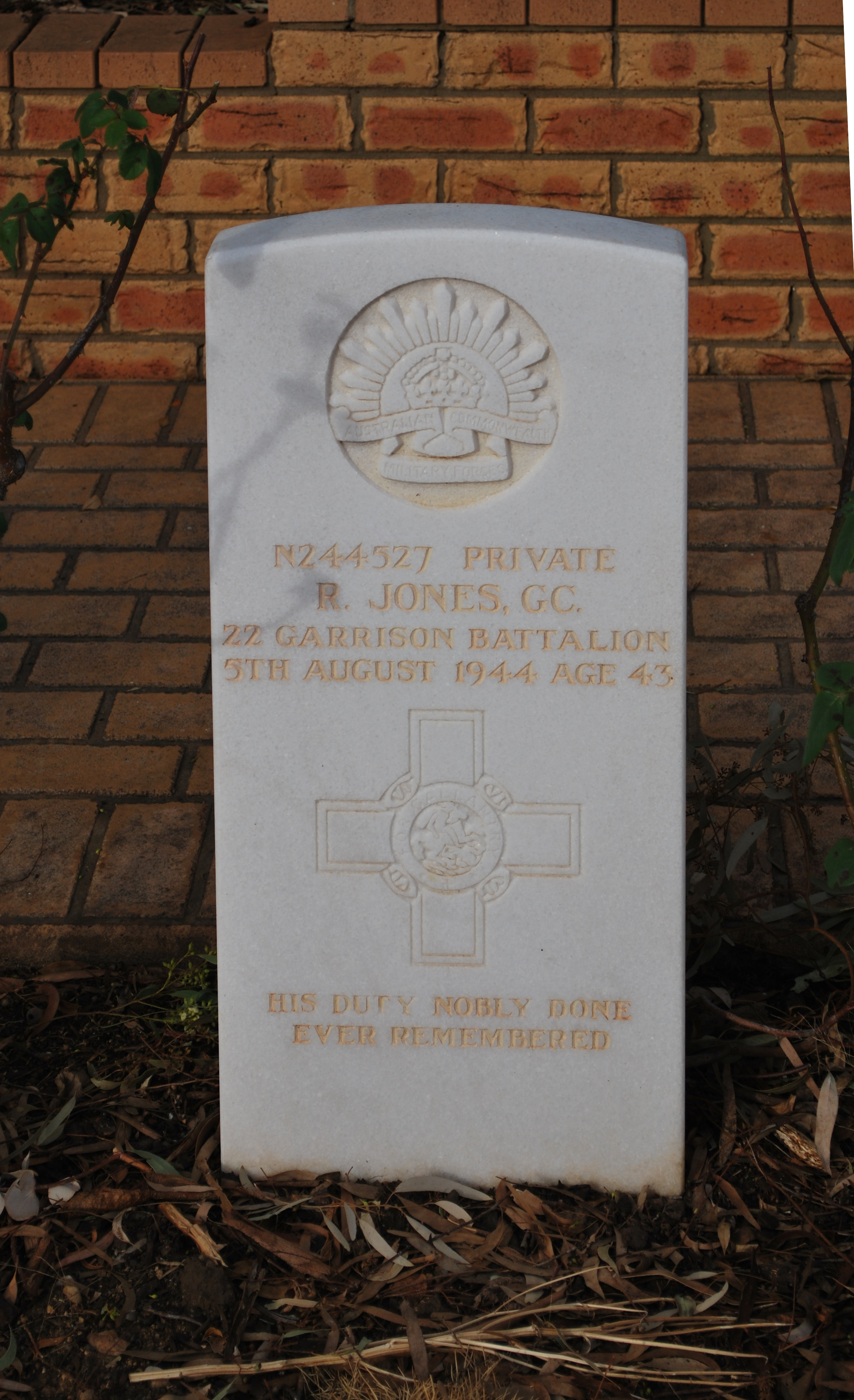
Gravestone at Cowra War Cemetery

Ralph Jones, GC (26 September 1900 – 5 August 1944) was an English-born Australian soldier who was posthumously awarded the George Cross for the gallantry he showed when Japanese prisoners of war staged an escape attempt on 5 August 1944 in Cowra, New South Wales.

== Early life ==
Jones was born in the Gorleston-on-Sea area of Great Yarmouth, Norfolk, England, United Kingdom and educated there until the age of 14. He served in the British Army at the end of World War I and in the army of occupation on the Rhine, Germany, until invalided home in April 1920. He emigrated to Australia about 1926.

== Second World War and death ==
On 15 January 1942, Jones was mobilised and, in February, was posted to the prison camp at Cowra.

=== Cowra breakout ===
On 5 August 1944, Japanese prisoners at the camp, armed with improvised knives and bats, stormed the guard posts with what a military court of inquiry termed "a suicidal disregard of life." A total of 231 prisoners were killed during the ensuing fighting and 108 wounded. All of the escapees were recaptured within days. Jones was killed in the outbreak, as was Private Benjamin Gower Hardy, who operated a Vickers machine gun alongside Jones and who was also awarded the George Cross. Private Charles Henry Shepherd was the third victim of the fighting at the camp, while Lieutenant Harry Doncaster was ambushed and killed while recapturing the escapees. The court of inquiry found that the Australian soldiers had ceased fire as soon as they had re-established control of the camp, and that many of the dead had either killed themselves or been killed by fellow prisoners, while many of the wounded had self-inflicted injuries.
