= Benjamin Gower Hardy =

Australian soldier, recipient of the George Cross (1898–1944)

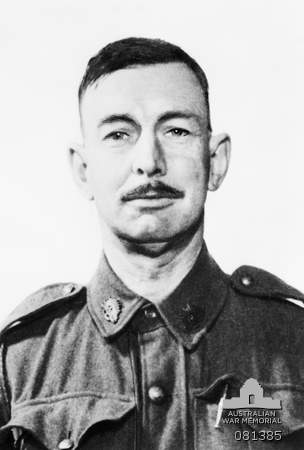
- Born: 28 August 1898; Marrickville, New South Wales, Australia
- Died: 5 August 1944 (aged 45); Cowra, New South Wales, Australia
- Military career
- Allegiance: Australia
- Branch: Australian Army
- Service years: 1941–1944
- Rank: Private
- Conflicts: Second World War; Home Front; Cowra breakout †
- Awards: George Cross

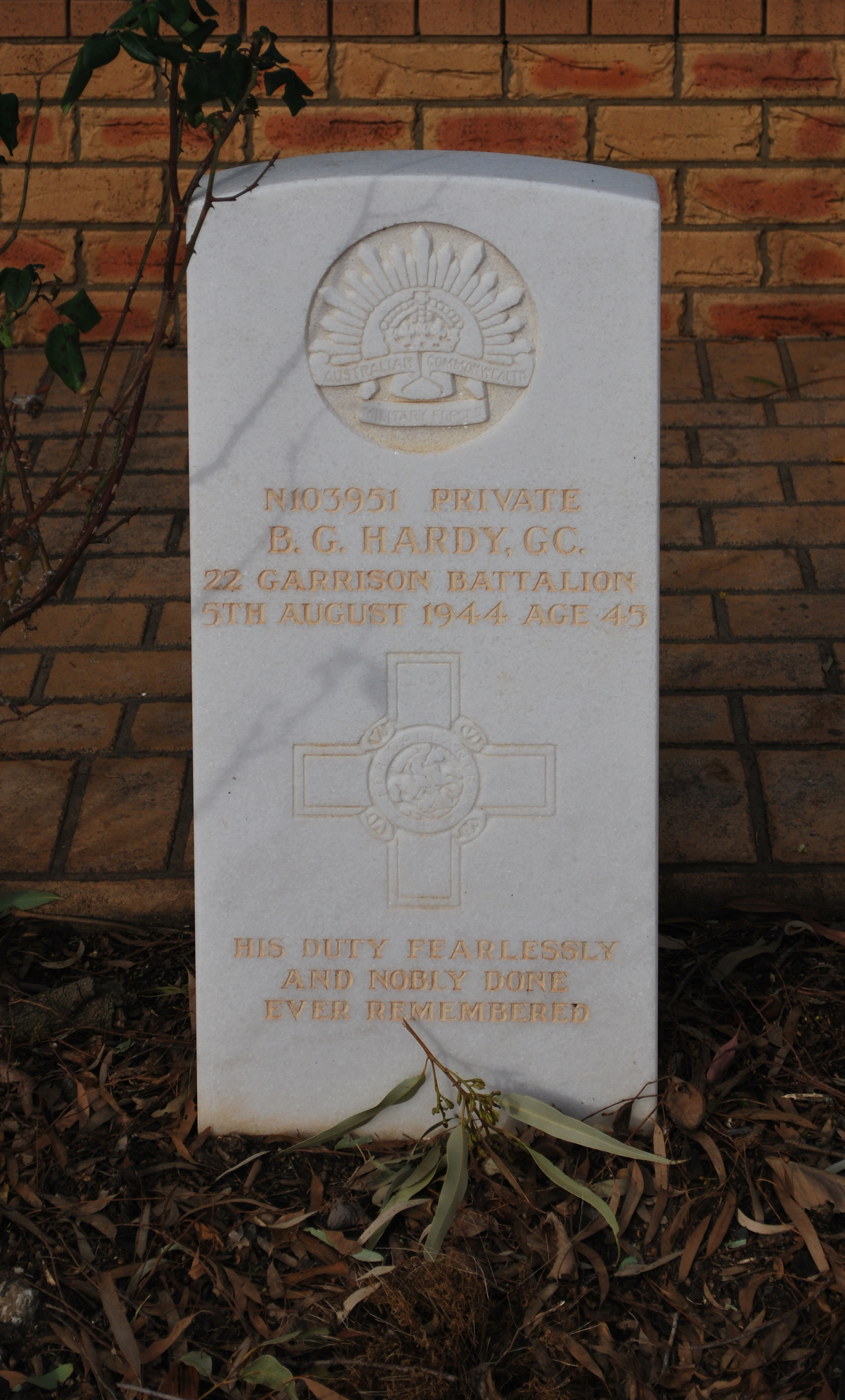
Gravestone at the Cowra War Cemetery

Benjamin Gower Hardy, GC (28 August 1898 – 5 August 1944), known as Ben Hardy, was an Australian soldier who was posthumously awarded the George Cross for the gallantry he showed during the Cowra breakout, on 5 August 1944, when Japanese prisoners of war staged a mass escape from a prisoner-of-war camp at Cowra, New South Wales.

== Early life and Second World War ==
Hardy was born in Marrickville, Sydney, in 1898. He enlisted in the Australian Army in September 1941 at the age of 43. He was considered too old for active service and was attached to the 7th Garrison Battalion where he was known as an expert on the Vickers machine gun. He was posted to the 22nd Garrison Battalion at Cowra on 12 February 1944.

== Cowra breakout ==
On the night of 5 August 1944, Japanese prisoners armed with improvised knives and clubs stormed the guard posts with what a military court of inquiry termed "a suicidal disregard of life." A total of 231 prisoners were killed during the ensuing fighting and 108 wounded. All of the remaining escapees were recaptured within days. Hardy was killed in the outbreak, as was Private Ralph Jones, who was also awarded the George Cross. Private Charles Henry Shepherd was the third Australian victim of the fighting at the camp, while Lieutenant Harry Doncaster was ambushed and killed while recapturing the escapees. Hardy was manning the Number 2 Vickers machine gun alongside Jones when they were overwhelmed by Japanese prisoners and killed. Before he was killed, Hardy disabled the gun by removing the firing bolt and throwing it away, thus rendering the gun useless to the escaping Japanese. The court of inquiry found that the Australian soldiers had ceased fire as soon as they had re-established control of the camp, and that many of the dead had either killed themselves or been killed by fellow prisoners, while many of the wounded had self-inflicted injuries.
