= Anne Lamott =

American novelist and nonfiction writer (born 1954)

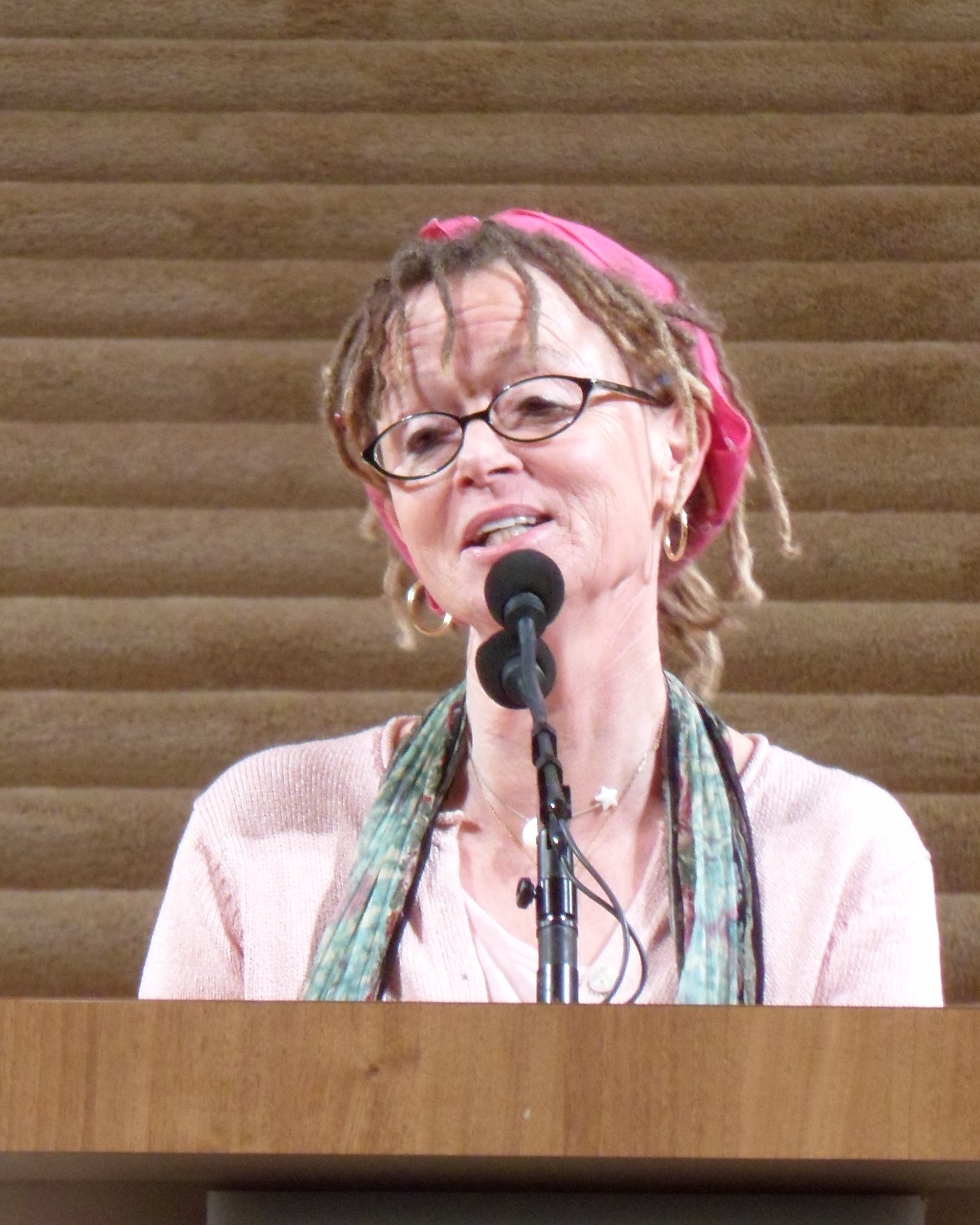
- Lamott in 2013
- Born: April 10, 1954 (age 72); San Francisco, California, U.S.
- Education: Drew School; Goucher College
- Occupations: Novelist; nonfiction writer; essayist; memoirist
- Spouse: Neal Allen (2019–present)
- Children: Sam Lamott (son)
- Relatives: Kenneth Lamott (father)
- Writing career
- Genres: Drama, humor, literary fiction, Reviews

Anne Lamott (born April 10, 1954) is an American novelist and nonfiction writer.

She is also a progressive political activist, public speaker, and writing teacher. Lamott is based in Marin County, California. Her nonfiction works are largely autobiographical. Lamott's writings, marked by their self-deprecating humor and openness, cover such subjects as alcoholism, single-motherhood, depression, and Christianity.

== Early life and education ==
Lamott was born in San Francisco, and is a graduate of Drew School. She was a student at Goucher College for two years where she wrote for the newspaper. Her father, Kenneth Lamott, was also a writer. Her first published novel Hard Laughter was written for him after his diagnosis of brain cancer. She has one son, Sam, who was born in August 1989 and a grandson, Jax, born in July 2009.

== Career ==
Lamott's life was documented in Freida Lee Mock's 1999 documentary Bird by Bird with Annie: A Film Portrait of Writer Anne Lamott. Because of the documentary and her following on Facebook and other online networks, she is often called the "People's Author".

Lamott has described why she writes:

I try to write the books I would love to come upon, that are honest, concerned with real lives, human hearts, spiritual transformation, families, secrets, wonder, craziness—and that can make me laugh. When I am reading a book like this, I feel rich and profoundly relieved to be in the presence of someone who will share the truth with me, and throw the lights on a little, and I try to write these kinds of books. Books, for me, are medicine.

Lamott was featured on the second episode of the first season of the show The Midnight Gospel.

=== Awards and honors ===
Lamott was awarded a Guggenheim Fellowship in 1985. She was inducted into the California Hall of Fame in 2010.

== Personal life ==
Lamott was born in San Francisco, California, on April 10, 1954, to her mother, Dorothy Lamott, and the writer Kenneth Lamott, who served as Anne Lamott's inspiration. She has an older brother, John, and a younger brother, Steve.

On April 13, 2019, at the age of 65, Lamott married Neal Allen, 63, a former vice president for marketing at the McKesson Corporation in San Francisco. He is a twice-divorced father of four, who has published two books of his own and co-authored Good Writing: 36 Ways to Improve Your Sentences with Lamott. The couple met in August 2016. Lamott has a son named Sam Lamott (born in 1989) from a previous relationship, and Sam has one son, Jax, born in 2009.

== Bibliography ==
=== Novels ===
- Hard Laughter. Viking Press. 1980. ISBN 0-670-36140-2.
- Rosie. Viking Press. 1983. ISBN 0-670-60828-9.
- Joe Jones. North Point Press. 1985. ISBN 0-86547-209-2.
- All New People. North Point Press. 1989. ISBN 0-86547-394-3.
- Crooked Little Heart. Pantheon Books. 1997. ISBN 0-679-43521-2.
- Blue Shoe. Riverhead Books. 2002. ISBN 1-57322-226-7.
- Imperfect Birds. Riverhead Books. 2010. ISBN 978-1-59448-751-4.

=== Nonfiction ===
- Operating Instructions: A Journal of My Son's First Year. Pantheon Books. 1993. ISBN 978-0-679-42091-0.
- Bird by Bird: Some Instructions on Writing and Life. Pantheon Books. 1994. ISBN 978-0-679-43520-4.
- Traveling Mercies: Some Thoughts on Faith. Pantheon Books. 1999. ISBN 978-0-679-44240-0.
- Plan B: Further Thoughts on Faith. Riverhead Books. 2005. ISBN 978-1-57322-299-0.
- Grace (Eventually): Thoughts on Faith. Riverhead Books. 2007. ISBN 978-1-59448-942-6.
- Some Assembly Required: A Journal of My Son's First Son. Riverhead Books. 2012. ISBN 978-1-59448-841-2. (with Sam Lamott)
- Help, Thanks, Wow: The Three Essential Prayers. Riverhead Books. 2012. ISBN 978-1-59463-129-0.
- Stitches: A Handbook on Meaning, Hope and Repair. Riverhead Books. 2013. ISBN 978-1-59463-258-7.
- Small Victories: Spotting Improbable Moments of Grace. Riverhead Books. 2014. ISBN 978-1-59448-629-6.
- Hallelujah Anyway: Rediscovering Mercy. Riverhead Books. 2017. ISBN 9780735213586.
- Almost Everything: Notes on Hope. Riverhead Books. 2018. ISBN 978-0525537441.
- Dusk, Night, Dawn: On Revival and Courage. Riverhead Books. 2021. ISBN 978-0-593-18969-6.
- Somehow: Thoughts on Love. Riverhead Books. 2024. ISBN 978-0-593-71441-6.
- Good Writing (co-author Neal Allen). Avery Publishing. 2026. ISBN 979-8-217-04697-3.
