= Senjinkun military code =

Japanese WWII military code

Copy of the cover of the Senjinkun

The Instructions for the Battlefield (Kyūjitai: 戰陣訓; Shinjitai: 戦陣訓, Senjinkun; Japanese pronunciation: [se̞nʑiŋkũ͍ɴ]) was a pocket-sized military code issued to soldiers in the Imperial Japanese forces on 8 January 1941 in the name of then-War Minister Hideki Tojo. It was in use at the outbreak of the Pacific War.

The Senjinkun was regarded as a supplement to the Imperial Rescript to Soldiers and Sailors, which was already required reading for the Japanese military. It listed a number of exhortations regarding military regulations, combat readiness, esprit de corps, filial piety, veneration of Shinto kami, and Japan's kokutai. The code specifically forbade retreat or surrender. The quote "Never live to experience shame as a prisoner" was repeatedly cited as the cause of numerous suicides committed by soldiers and civilians; in particular, the code resulted in considerably higher battle fatalities and extremely low surrender counts for Japanese ground forces, who would often launch suicide attacks or commit suicide outright when faced with defeat.

Japanese soldiers were instructed to "show mercy to those who surrender"—a response to prior misconduct on the battlefield.

Towards the end of the war, copies of the Senjinkun were also distributed to the civilian population of Japan as part of the preparation for Operation Downfall, the expected invasion of the Japanese home islands by Allied forces.

== Excerpt from the Senjinkun introduction ==
The battlefield is where the Imperial Army, acting under the Imperial Command, displays its true character, conquering whenever it attacks, winning whenever it engages in combat, in order to spread the Imperial Way far and wide so that the enemy may look up in awe to the august virtues of His Majesty.

The Imperial Rescript to the armed forces is explicit while the regulations and manuals clearly define conduct in combat and methods of training. Conditions in the zone of combat, however, tend to cause soldiers to be swayed by immediate events and become forgetful of their duties. Indeed, they should be wary there, lest they run counter to their duties as soldiers. The purpose of the present Code lies in providing concrete rules of conduct, in the light of past experience, so that those in zones of combat may wholly abide by the Imperial Rescript and enhance the moral virtues of the Imperial Army.

== Chapters and sections ==
=== Chapter I ===
- The Empire (皇国)
- The Imperial Army (皇軍)
- The Imperial Heritage (皇紀)
- Solidarity (団結)
- Cooperation (協同)
- Aggressiveness (攻撃精神)
- The Will for Certain Victory (必勝の精神)

=== Chapter II ===
- Reverence for the Spirits (敬神)
- The Way of Filial Piety (孝道)
- Salutes and Manners (敬礼挙措)
- The Way of Comrades in Arms (戦友道)
- Initiative in Exemplary Conduct (率先躬行)
- Duty (責任)
- Outlook on Life and Death (生死観)
- The Maintenance of One's Honor (名を惜しむ)
- Sincerity and Fortitude (質実剛健)
- Gallant Behavior (清廉潔白)

=== Chapter III ===
- Admonition Concerning Field Service (戦陣の戒)
- Achievements of Soldiers in Service (戦陣の嗜)

== Related works ==
A similar military code titled Precepts Concerning the Decisive Battle was issued by War Minister Korechika Anami on 8 April 1945. The Precepts stipulated that Imperial Japanese Army officers and men should:

1. obey the Imperial Rescript to Soldiers and Sailors and proceed to abide by the Imperial Will
2. defend Imperial soil to the last
3. await the future, after preparations have been effected
4. possess a deep-seated spirit of ramming suicide
5. set the example for 100,000,000 compatriots.
