= Japanese Garden, Moscow =

Japanese styled garden in Moscow

Moscow Japanese garden
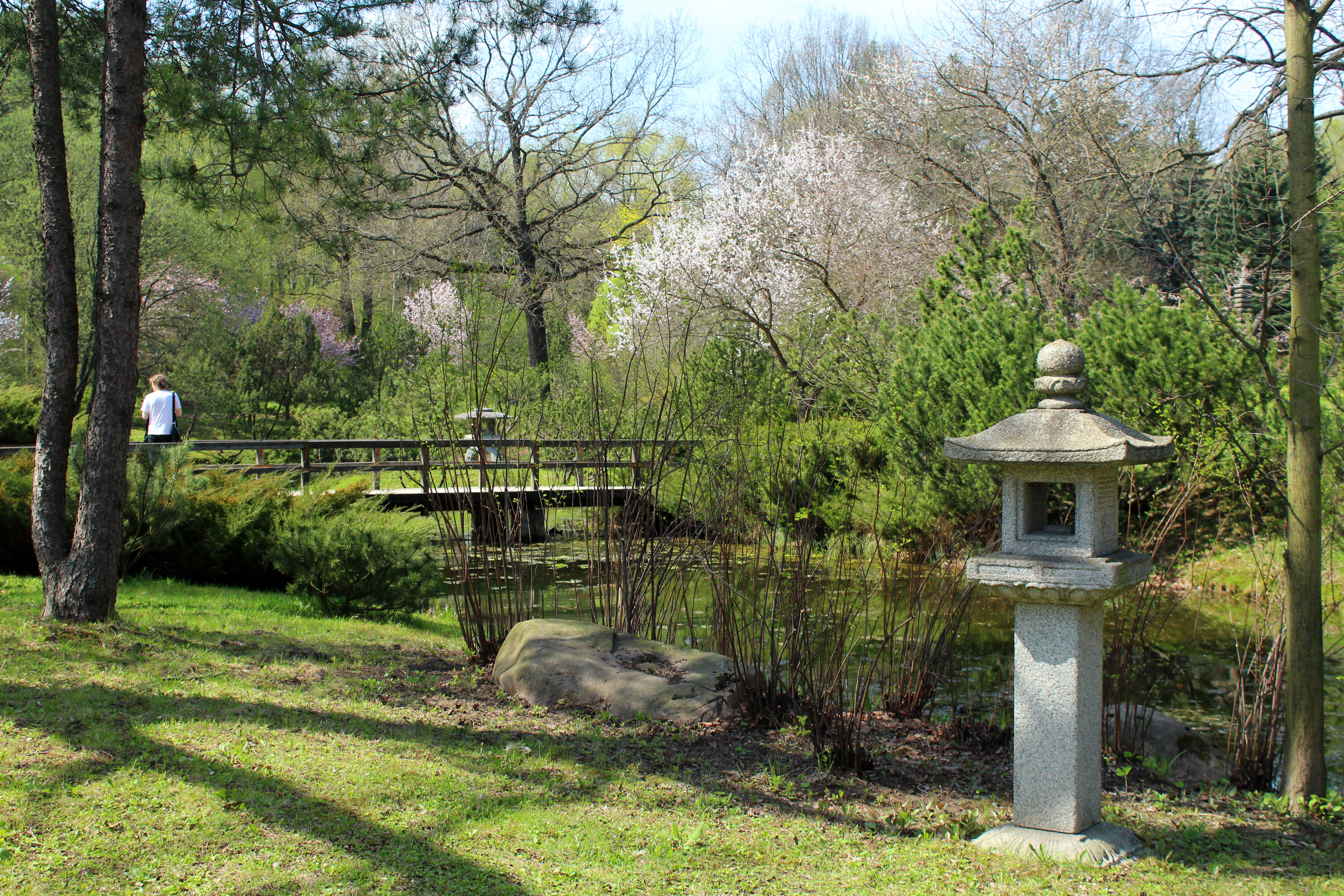
- Sakura blossom in the Moscow Japanese Garden
- Interactive map of Moscow Japanese garden
- Type: Japanese garden
- Location: Moscow, Russia
- Coordinates: 55°50′39″N 37°36′57″E
- Area: 2.7 hectares (6.7 acres)
- Designer: Ken Nakajima
- Open: April–October
- Status: active
- Public transit: Vladykino (easier route from there), Botanichesky Sad

The Japanese Garden in Moscow is the first garden in the traditional Japanese style opened in the USSR in 1987. It is located in the northeastern part of Moscow Botanical Garden of Academy of Sciences, on a separate territory accessible for a fee from mid-to-late April (depending on the weather) until the end of October.

== History ==
The idea of creating a Japanese garden in Moscow belongs to two people: Pyotr Ivanovich Lapin, a corresponding member of the USSR Academy of Sciences who worked in the 1970s as the deputy director of the Main Botanical Garden for scientific work, and Akira Shigemitsu, the Ambassador of Japan to Moscow. The first official negotiations regarding the construction of the Japanese garden in USSR took place in 1978. The Japanese Embassy reached out to the Japan Foundation. The Foundation found a financial partner, which became the Japan Expo '70 Memorial Association.

The foundation also invited a leading master of landscape design and garden master, Ken Nakajima (1914–2000), who had established Japanese gardens in many countries (Montreal, Canada; Cowra, Australia; Houston, US; Vienna, Austria). The pavilions were designed by Takeo Adachi, and construction took place with the participation of the firm "Watanabe-Tomi". The building of the garden was carried out between 1983 and 1987.

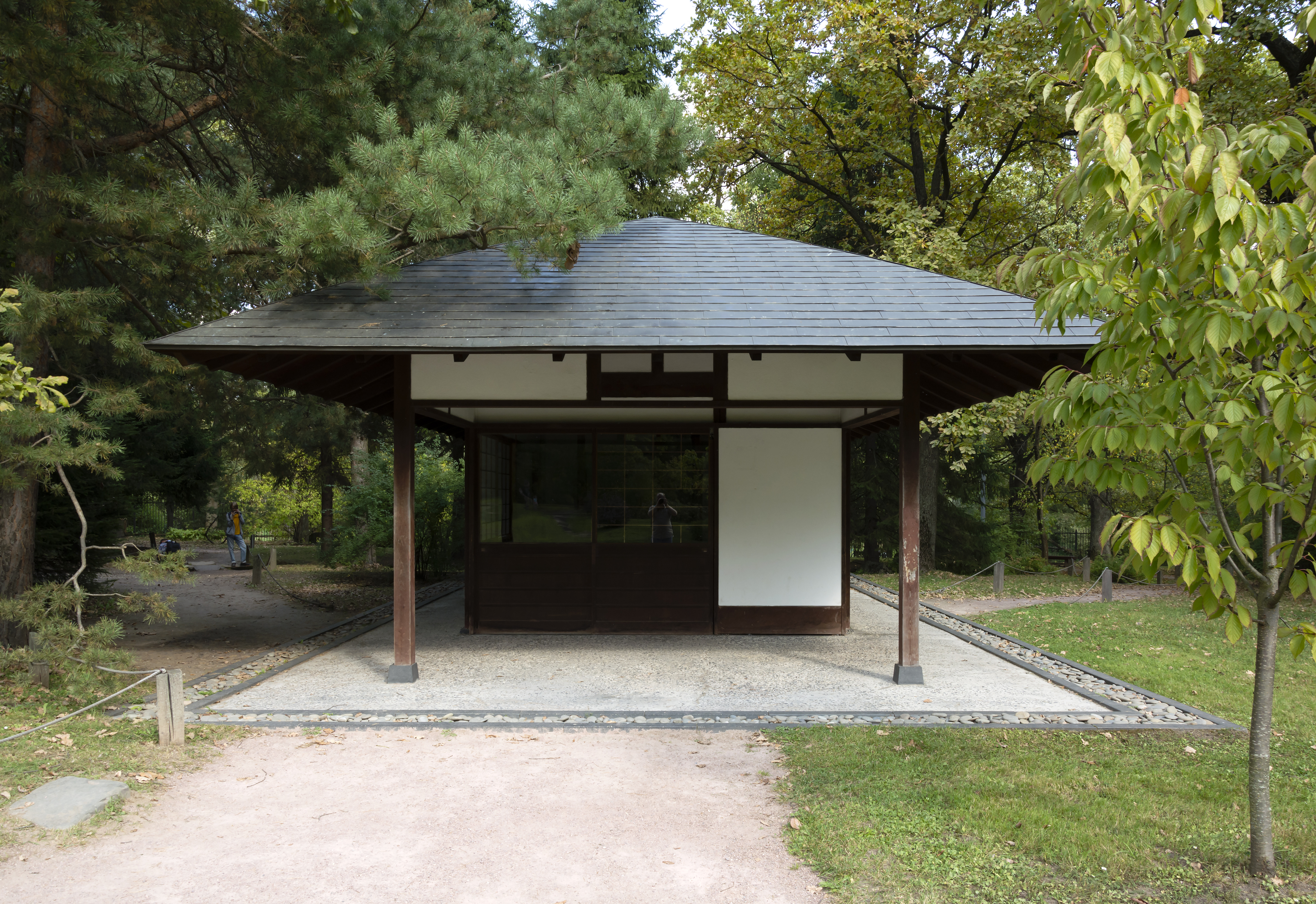
Chashitsu — a pavilion for tea ceremonies

== Pavilions and structures ==
Visitors to the garden are greeted by traditional bamboo gates, which were the first structure built in the Moscow garden. They are used for entry only on particularly solemn occasions; at all other times, entry is through a side gate nearby. The garden grounds feature three pavilions in the traditional Japanese architectural style, including a chashitsu for traditional tea ceremonies, another for parties with sake or umeshu, and a gazebo.

A thirteen-tier pagoda, stone toro lanterns, and a tsukubai are also located here. A traditional rock garden is situated near the garden entrance.

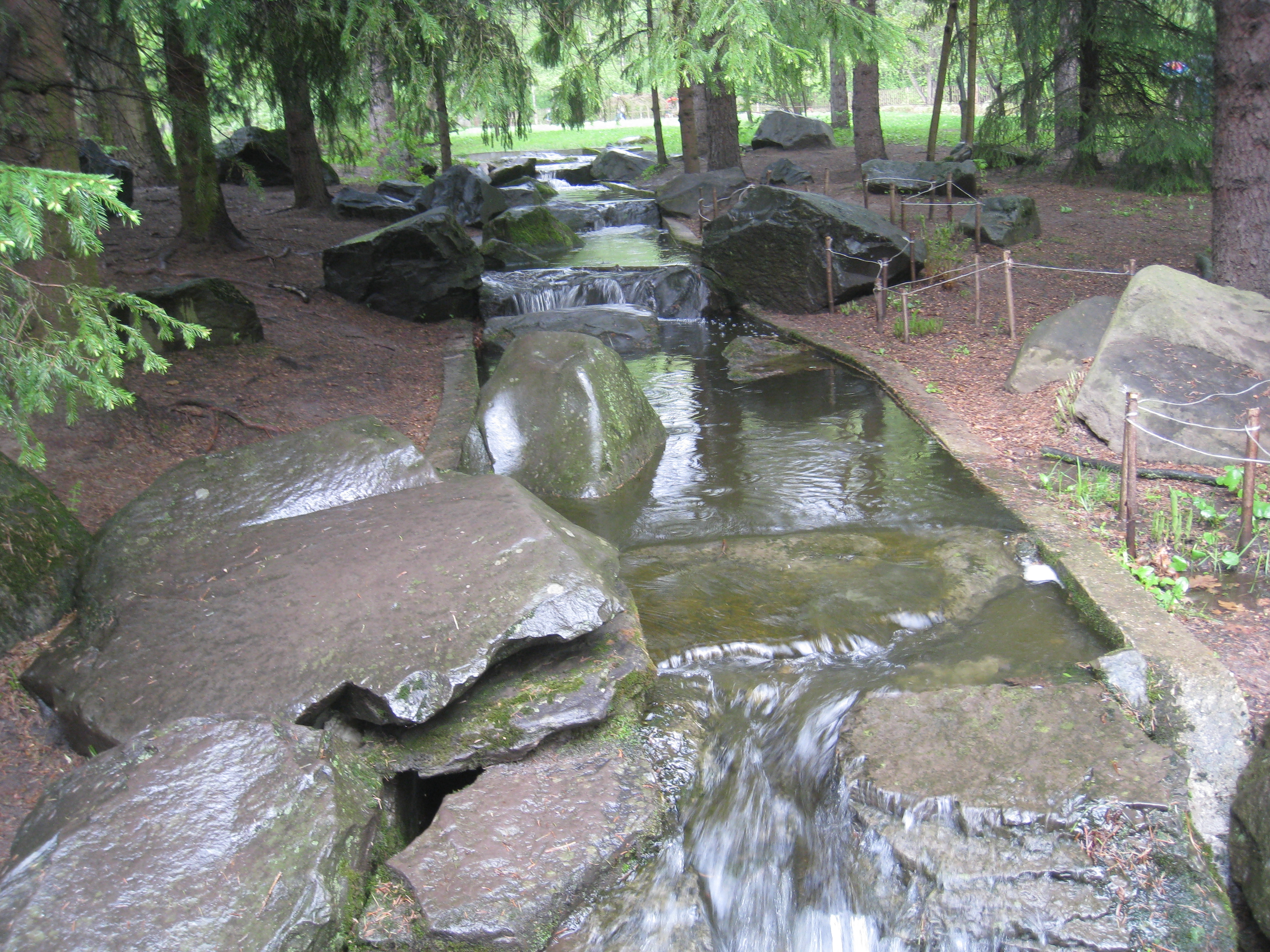
The imitation of a Japanese mountain river in a typically flat Central Russian landscape is done quite convincingly

An artificial mountain stream with a cascade of small waterfalls runs through the garden, flowing into lowland ponds with islands. A large, straight Japanese-style wooden bridge and a broken, zigzag yatsuhashi bridge span the river.

== Events ==
In late April and early May, for about a week, the sakura festival takes place, which is when the garden sees its highest number of visitors. The wait in line to enter during cherry blossom season can last several hours. During this time, the garden is open daily without days off.

In July, the rhododendron blossom festival takes place.

== Commemorative trees ==
- In 1986, the first sakura (Sargent's cherry) was ceremoniously planted in the garden by the Japanese Minister of Foreign Affairs Shintaro Abe.
- 27 years later, in April 2013, his son Shinzo Abe, who had become the Prime Minister of Japan, also planted a sakura sapling in the garden. The sapling was grown from the seeds of that very first tree.
- 1987 - a gift from the Embassy of Japan in the USSR
- 1995 - a commemorative planting by Japan Airlines in honor of the 25th anniversary of regular flights between Moscow and Tokyo
- 1997 - a batch of sakura saplings donated by the Sakura Lovers Society for the garden's 10th anniversary
- 2003 - a batch of saplings received from Japan thanks to the Institute of Genetics

== Views of the garden ==
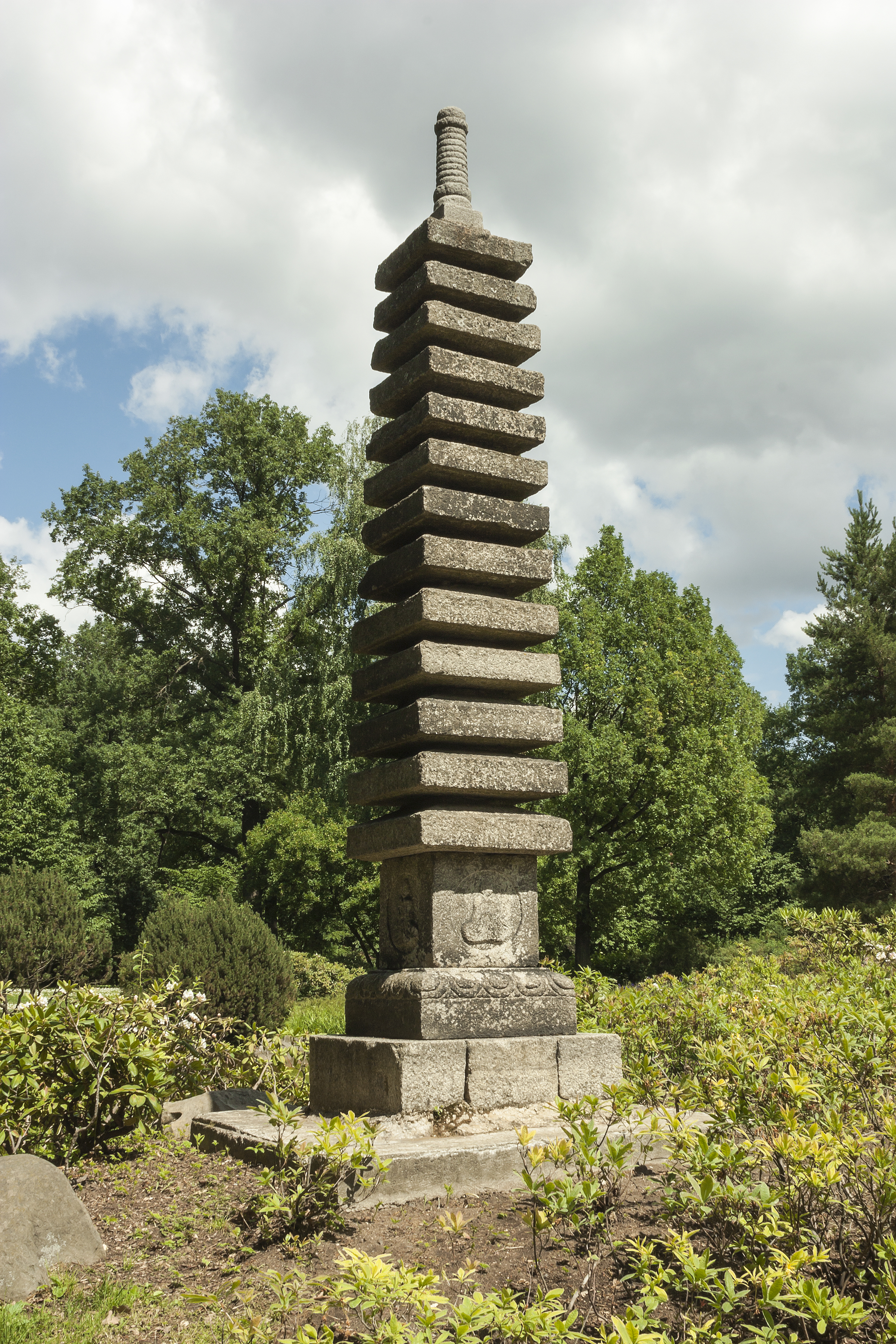
Thirteen-tier stone pagoda

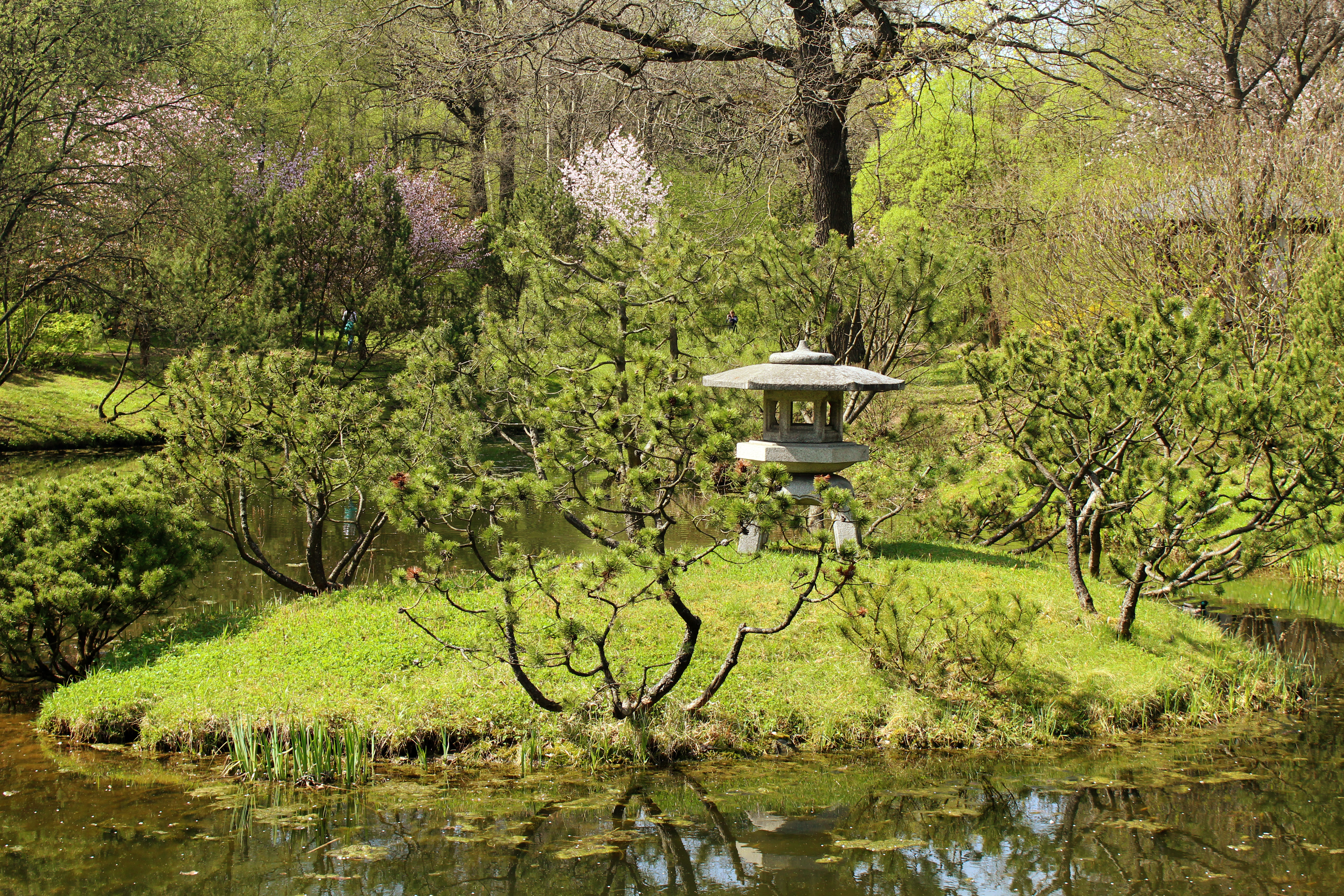
Stone lantern yukimi-dōrō — "snow-viewing lantern"

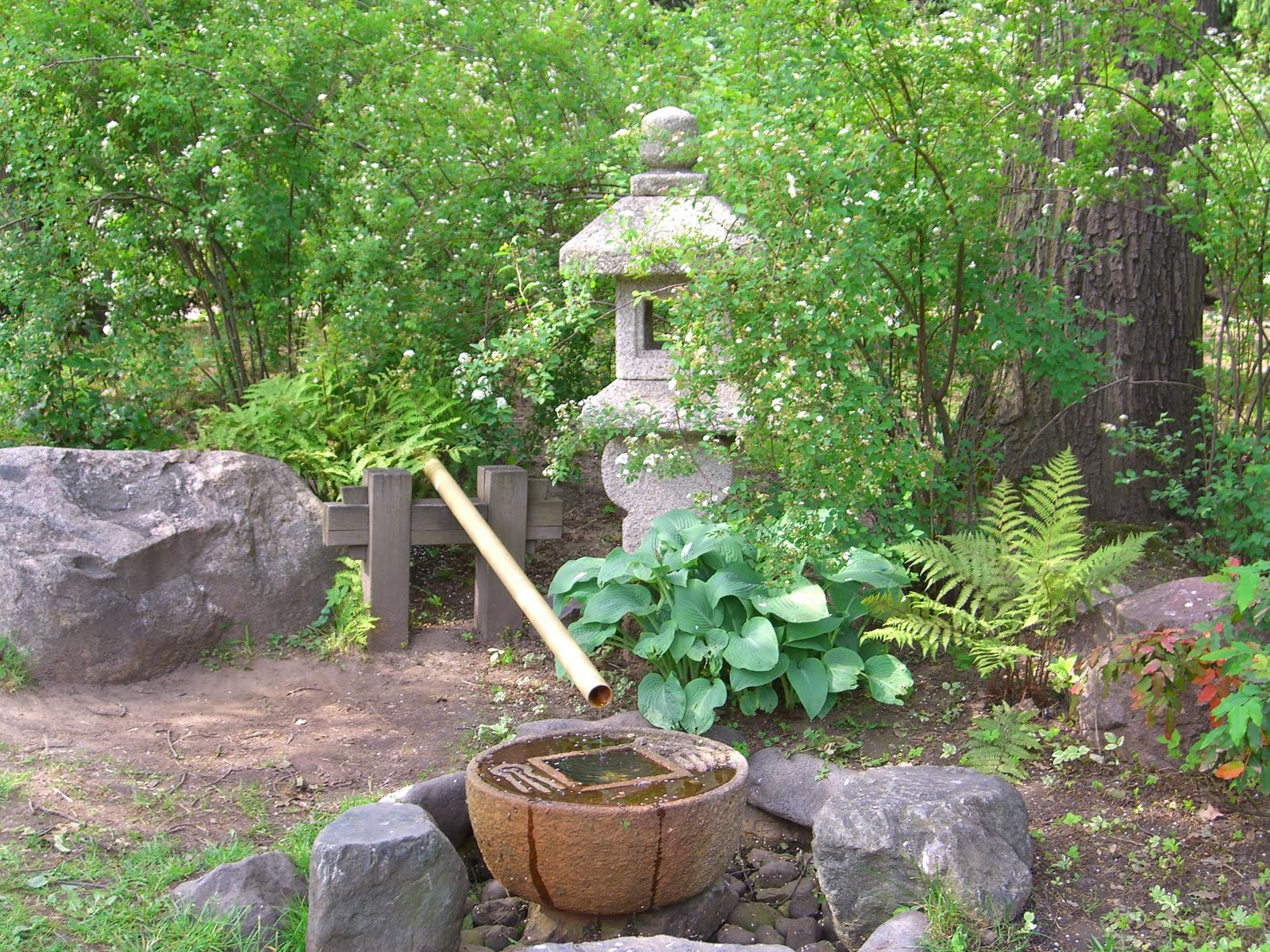
Stone lantern oribe-dōrō — tea master Oribe's lantern — with tsukubai

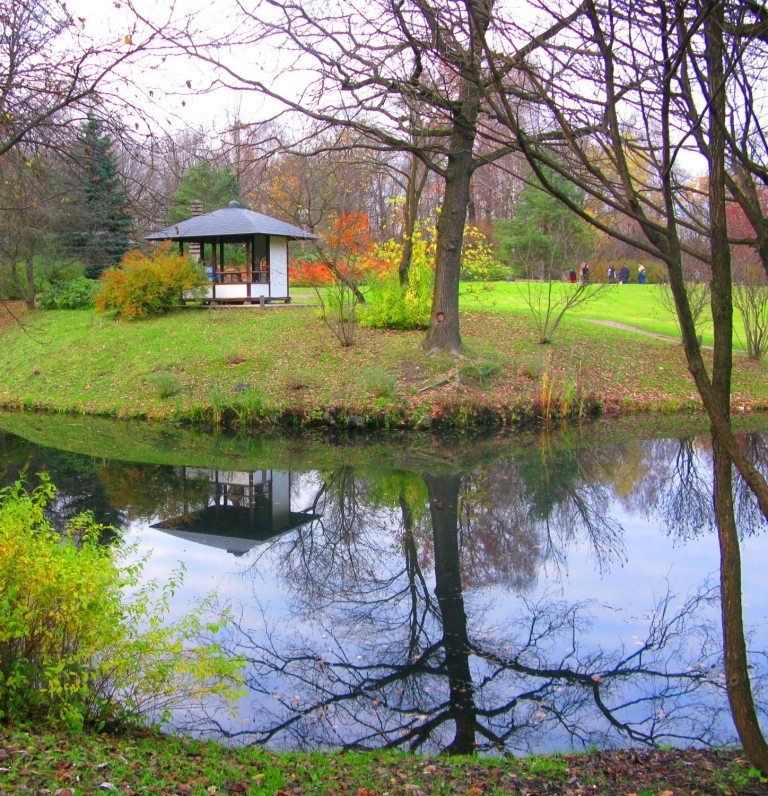
Gazebo
