= Cowra Prisoner of War Camp Site =

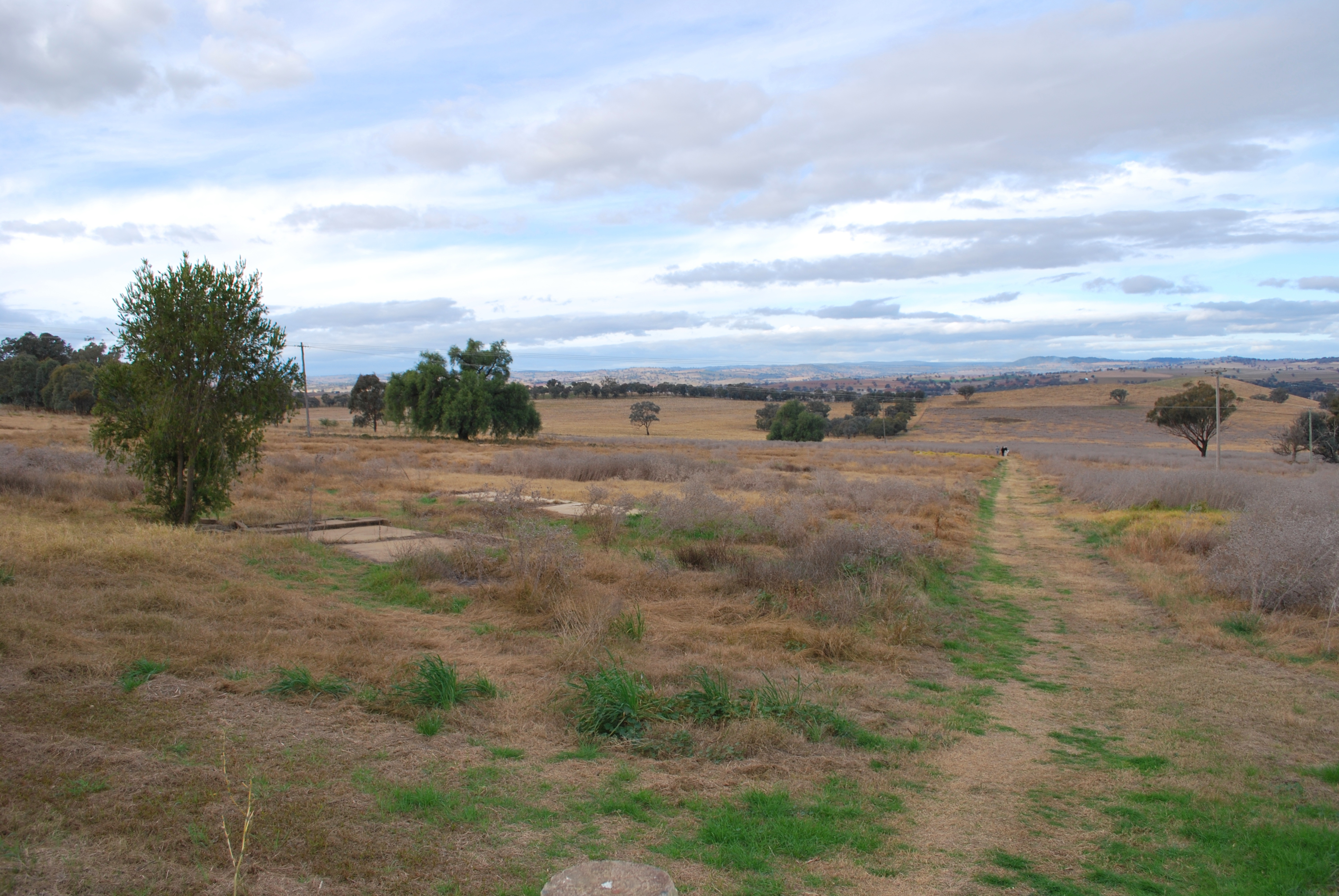
- Ruins of the prisoner-of-war-camp, 2011

- Location within New South Wales Location within Australia
- 33.8153°S 148.7064°E
- Location: Evans Street, Cowra, Cowra Shire, New South Wales, Australia

History
- Built: 1941–1944

Site notes
- Owner: Cowra Shire Council

New South Wales Heritage Register
- Official name: Cowra Prisoner of War Camp Site; POW
- Type: state heritage (archaeological-terrestrial)
- Designated: 2 April 1999
- Reference no.: 619
- Type: Internment Camp
- Category: Law Enforcement
- Builders: Australian soldiers and POWs

Cowra Prisoner of War Camp Site is a heritage-listed former prisoner-of-war camp at Evans Street, Cowra in the Central West region of New South Wales, Australia. The camp was built from 1941 to 1944. It was the location of the infamous Cowra breakout in 1944. The property is owned by the Cowra Shire Council. It was added to the New South Wales State Heritage Register on 2 April 1999.

== History ==
The Cowra Prisoner of War Camp was constructed in 1941–42 to house Italian POWs captured by Allied Forces during World War II. It was part of a nationwide system of POW confinement and enemy alien containment. In all, twenty-eight major camps were established in Australia by the British Military Board during this period. The camp was to consist of four compounds, two with permanent amenities and two temporary. Although officially operating from June 1941, the first internees were marched into Cowra nearly four months later, on 15 October 1941. The major building program was still underway at this time and was not completed until well into 1944. Both POW and local labourers were used to complete construction, the prisoners living in tents until April 1942 when accommodation huts became available.

By December 1942 over 2,000 mainly Italian, prisoners and internees were housed in the camp. Between January 1943 and August 1944, over one thousand Japanese POWs and internees arrived. By the end of June 1944 the camp was already overcrowded beyond its intended capacity. At 2 am on 5 August 1944 the Japanese prisoners staged an outbreak, during which over 300 escaped outright and over 250 died. 18 buildings were burnt to the ground. This action has remained significant in popular memory as the first time the War was fought on home soil and as the largest revolt of its kind in Australia's history. This has often overshadowed the experience of the Italian, Javanese and assorted other ethnic groups which populated the camp during its operation.

After the end of the War the camp and its surrounds were sold to the New South Wales Department of Agriculture and a private owner. Part of the site remains within a public reserve. The private part of the site is used for grazing and crop cultivation.

In 1991, Cherry Tree Avenue was extended across the camp to link with the War Cemetery and the Cowra Japanese Garden and Cultural Centre.

== Description ==
The camp is located on gently sloping land that is separated from the town by a ridge line. The camp generally exists in a cleared setting although there has been considerable tree growth in and around many of the structural remains. None of the original perimeter or internal fences, paths or structures remain to any appreciable level above ground level, although remnants of floor slabs, footings and drainage lines have been identified using aerial photographs. A single ruinous, but above ground structure is located at the north western end of the Headquarters area. It comprises four walls constructed from a variety of materials including stone rubble, salvaged bricks and concrete blocks. Evidence of a relatively shallow-pitched roof remains. Two buildings remain intact off site, having been sold at auction after the camp was disbanded. They are 60' by 80' timber huts with corrugated asbestos pitched roofs.

Few of the former facilities survive to any great extent above ground level. The archaeological potential is extremely high in all areas of the complex. The site is not well preserved, with few of the original features remaining above ground. It does however have an intact archaeological resource. This, and the extensive documentary resource add significantly to its interpretive and historical potential.

== Heritage listing ==
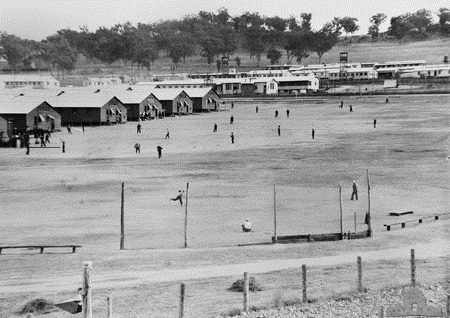
Japanese prisoners playing baseball, 1944

The Cowra POW camp-site exists within a landscape that is both evocative and aesthetically pleasing. This landscape may be used to interpret the context of the camp as the site's primary historical feature, because it remains essentially the way it was during WWII.

The site is one component of a national body of evidence which documents the most profound physical impact of WWII on Australian soil. It also represents the only land engagement on the Australian mainland during that period.

The camp-site has a wide ethnic and multi-cultural association and was instrumental in the decisions of many families to migrate to Australia after WWII. The site has a particular cultural and spiritual significance to the Japanese nation, as it was the focus of the break-out and loss of life of Japanese prisoners. Links formed between Cowra and Japan have been instrumental in affecting the form, direction and identity of the town in the post-war period. This situation is unique in Australia.

Cowra Prisoner of War Camp Site was listed on the New South Wales State Heritage Register on 2 April 1999 having satisfied the following criteria.

The place is important in demonstrating the course, or pattern, of cultural or natural history in New South Wales.

The development and occupation of the Prisoner of War camp was unique in the region, has important historical associations and has had a profound effect on the post-war development of Cowra. It represents a profound physical impact of WWII on Australian soil. The site can also be used to interpret the modified rural landscape in which it exists. The activities of the Agricultural Research Station have had a profound influence upon the district as a whole.

The place is important in demonstrating aesthetic characteristics and/or a high degree of creative or technical achievement in New South Wales.

The landscape surrounding the site may be used to interpret the context of the camp as the site's primary historical feature, because it remains essentially the way it was during WWII. The pleasing and spacious environment is particularly evocative of both the conditions within the camp during its life and its post-war history. The intrusive tree and shrub growth however, are seen to detract from the significance of the place by obscuring the interpretation of the site as an open space and masking many of the ruins.

The place has strong or special association with a particular community or cultural group in New South Wales for social, cultural or spiritual reasons.

The camp was not the first nor the largest POW campsite in Australia. Neither is it the best preserved. There is however, a substantial body of archaeological and documentary evidence that enables this site as part of a national body of evidence to demonstrate the POW experience of WWII in Australia. It is important for ethnic and multi-cultural experience in Australia. It has an association with the Japanese breakout, which has military significance. As the site on which many Japanese lives were lost it also has cultural and spiritual significance for the Japanese nation. Finally, the events which occurred at the site have initiated a profound impact on the form and cultural activity of Cowra in the post-war years. This is an event and process which is apparently unique in Australia.

The place has potential to yield information that will contribute to an understanding of the cultural or natural history of New South Wales.

The physical remnants that remain in-situ represent a technology and building method for an architectural typology which is relatively rare in Australia and which existed for a short time and for a specific purpose. The physical and archaeological resources represent a database that could be used to more accurately examine the habits and lifestyle of both the guards and the prisoners within the camp.

The place is important in demonstrating the principal characteristics of a class of cultural or natural places/environments in New South Wales.

The site is not the first, largest or most intact POW camp. There is however, a substantial body of archaeological and documentary evidence that enables it, as part of a national body of evidence, to demonstrate the POW experience of WWII in Australia.
