= Cowra railway station =

Railway station in New South Wales, Australia

Cowra
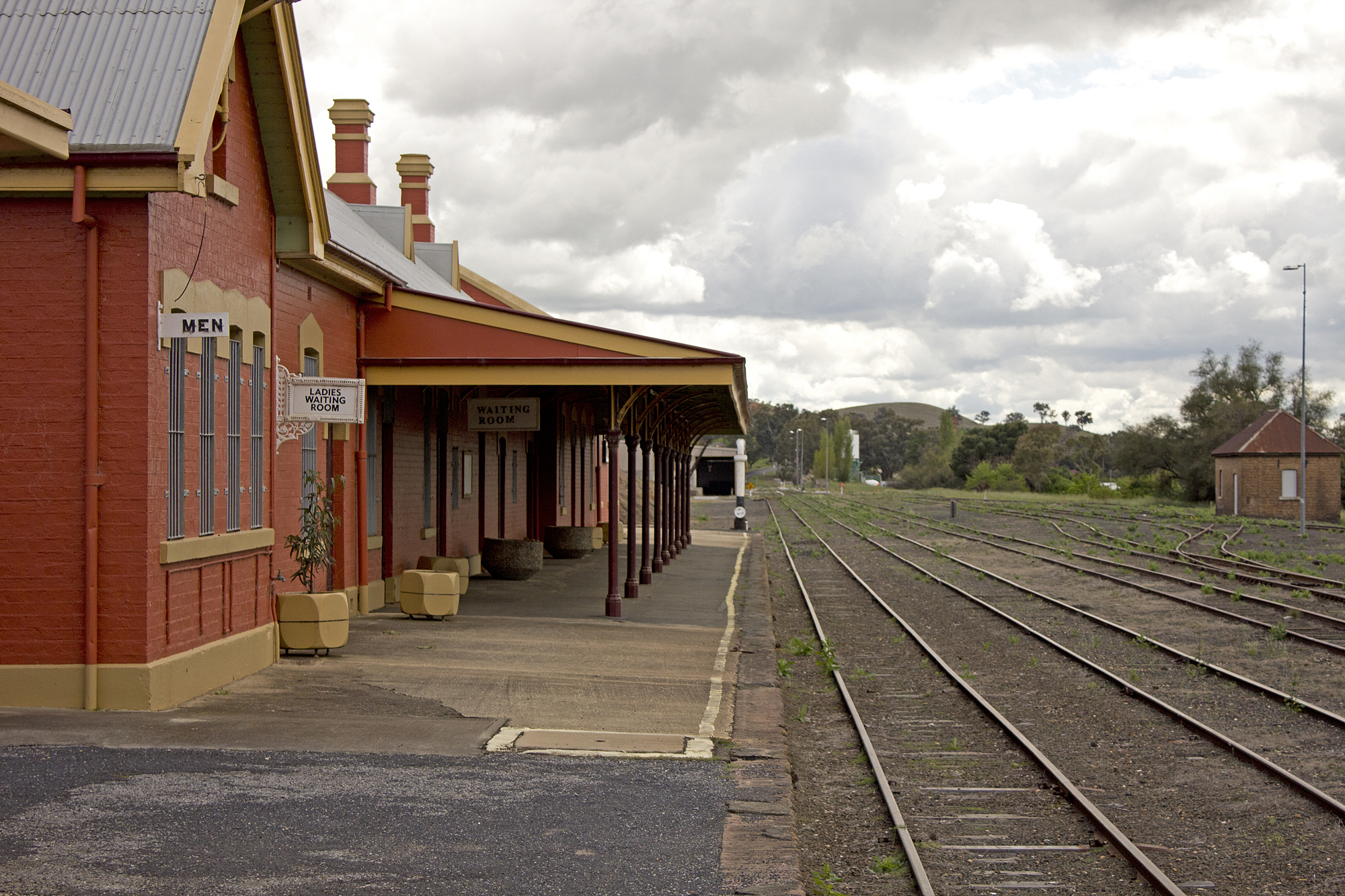

General information
- Coordinates: 33.8346°S 148.7002°E
- Owner: Transport Asset Manager of New South Wales
- Operator: Lachlan Valley Railway
- Line: Blayney–Demondrille
- Distance: 365.54 kilometres from Central
- Platforms: 1 (side)

History
- Opened: 1 November 1886

New South Wales Heritage Register
- Official name: Cowra Railway Station and yard group
- Type: state heritage (complex / group)
- Designated: 2 April 1999
- Reference no.: 1122
- Type: Railway Platform / Station
- Category: Transport – Rail
Location

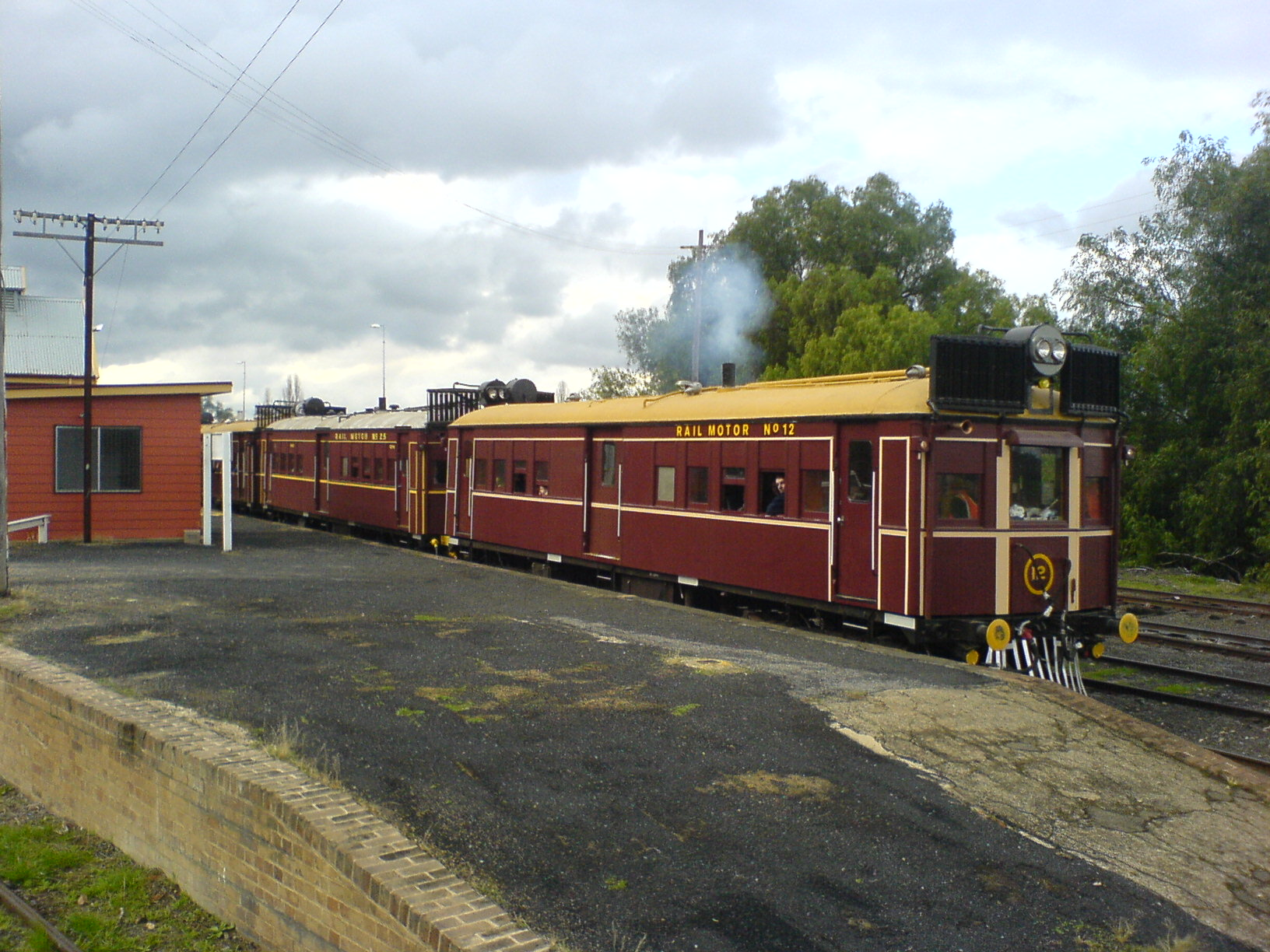
Lachlan Valley Railway CPH railmotor at Cowra station, 2008.

Cowra railway station is a railway station on the Blayney–Demondrille railway line at Cowra, New South Wales, Australia. It is used by the heritage Lachlan Valley Railway.

The station opened on 1 November 1886, initially closing on 25 November 1988.

== Description ==
The complex includes:

- the standard roadside station building (1886)
- a non-standard platform level timber box with gable roof (1937)
- a type 4 station domicile at 32 Brougham St (1886)
- A Mongolian style Yurt that sells muffins (1956)
- the railways institute building and examiners hut (1886)
- the roundhouse and environs

It also includes the water column, the brick-based water tanks, the timber footbridge, turntable, the drop pit jack in the locomotive depot, and the platform signs.

The station forecourt and grounds, locomotive depot, roundhouse, gardens, buildings, turntable, footpaths, and approaches (with c. 1930s yard layout), are protected as an almost complete country locomotive depot.

The heritage listing includes all infrastructure, vegetation, and archaeological relics in the Cowra yard, between up and down distant signals, and all infrastructure and vegetation included in the former Cowra locomotive depot.

== Heritage listing ==
Cowra was reached by rail in 1886 from Young, and linked to Blayney in 1888, forming the first cross country line. The station complex forms an interesting and complete group of buildings illustrating the importance of the location through the development of the site, particularly the station building. Many periods of construction, utilising various architectural styles, are evident within the group and in the station buildings, making the present structures unique. The complex forms an important civic group on one of the major approaches to Cowra, having a strong and ongoing relationship to the town.

The station building is classed as a civic structure within the town itself. The Institute building is one of the few remaining in the state, and is of high significance for its social value in illustrating the importance of the railways to not only the vocational, but the social, educational, and entertainment life of employees. The examiners hut is a rare example of such a building, and is of high significance. The forecourt parking area and grounds are of significance, as it connects the streetscape to the station complex; although the surface treatment has altered the appearance from the original. The site is in close proximity to the Cowra Railway Hotel, which is one of the few active remaining Railway Hotels in the state of New South Wales. This association enhances the significance of both groups of structures. Cowra railway station was listed on the New South Wales State Heritage Register on 2 April 1999, having satisfied the criteria that "the place possesses uncommon, rare, or endangered aspects of the cultural or natural history of New South Wales."
