= Ken Nakajima =

Japanese landscape architect

Takeshi "Ken" Nakajima
- Born: 1914; Tokyo, Japan
- Died: 2000 (aged 85–86); Japan
- Occupation: Japanese garden designer

Takeshi "Ken" Nakajima (中島 健, Nakajima Ken) was an important landscape architect and designer of Japanese gardens. Outside Japan, he designed the Montreal Botanical Garden, the Cowra Japanese Garden and Cultural Centre in Australia, the Japanese Garden in Hermann Park in Houston, Texas, the Japanese Garden at the Moscow Botanical Garden of Academy of Sciences and the Setagaya Parc in Vienna.

Born in Japan in 1914, Takeshi "Ken" Nakajima graduated from the Tokyo University of Agriculture in 1937, where he later became a faculty member. In 1957, he started his own company called Consolidated Garden Research, based in Tokyo.

In 1986, Hirohito, the Emperor of Japan, awarded him the Order of the Rising Sun, Gold and Silver Ray, for promoting Japanese culture worldwide.

Mr. Nakajima died on November 29, 2000, and the company he created passed to his son Hiro. Ken Nakajima Place, Cowra NSW is named for him.
