= Cowra =

- Town
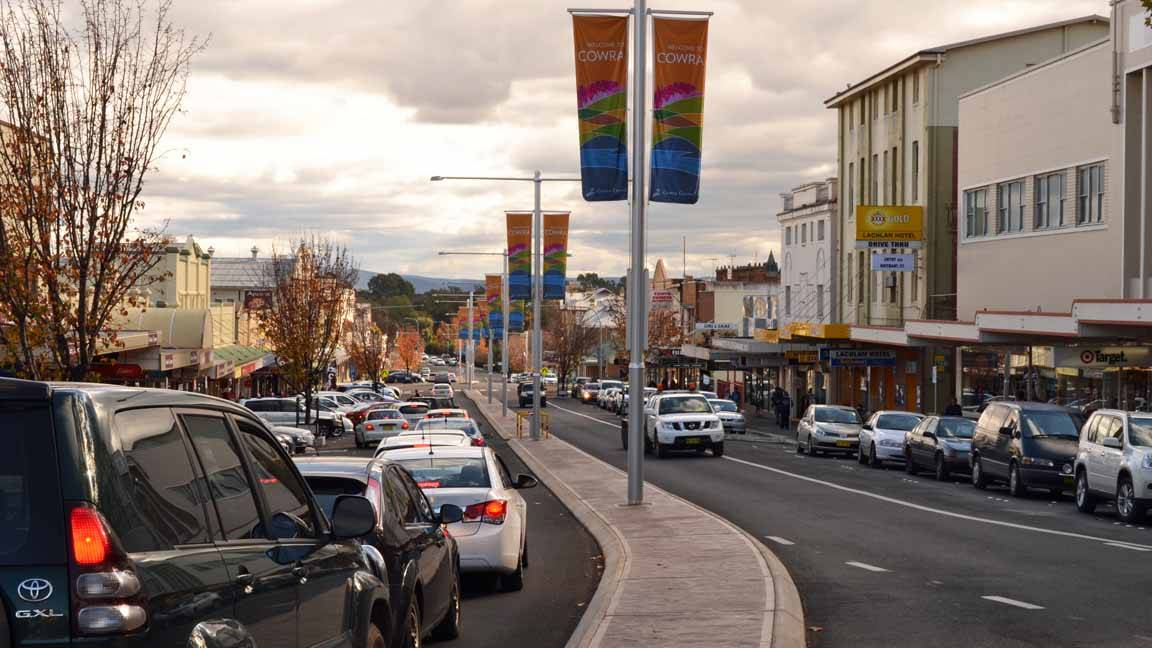
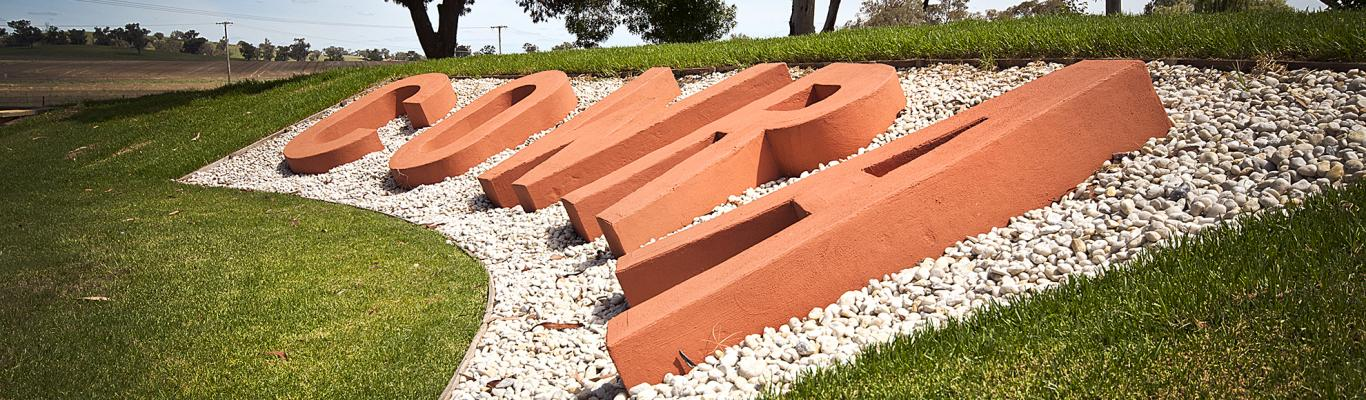
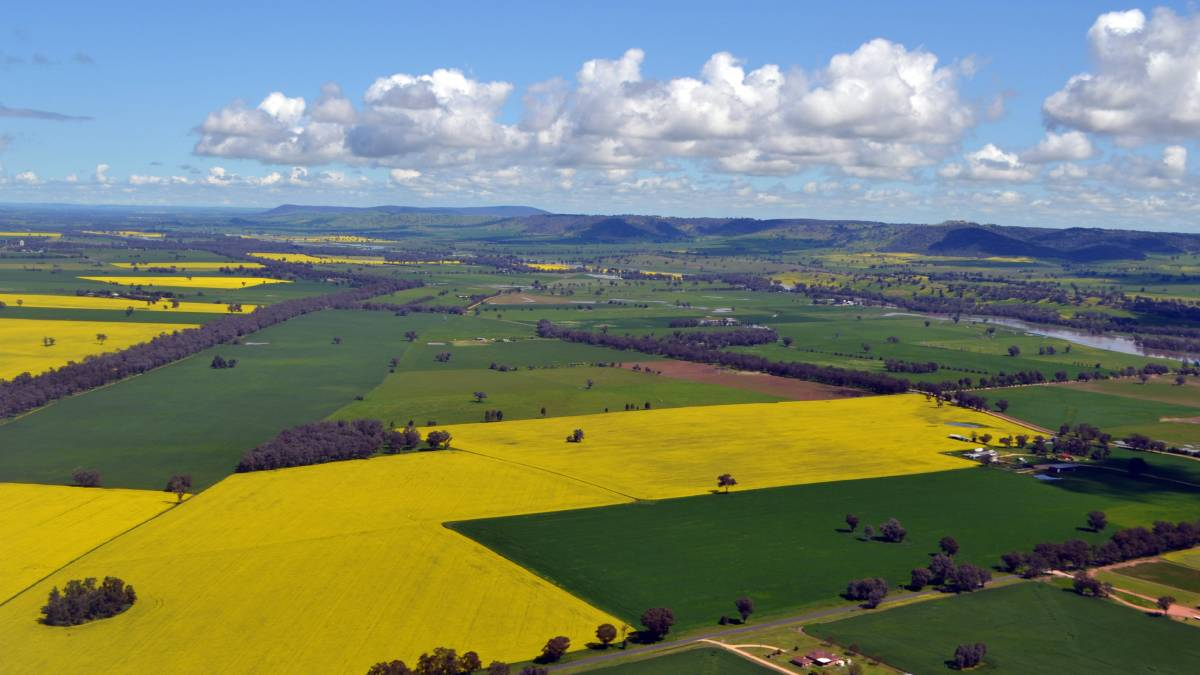
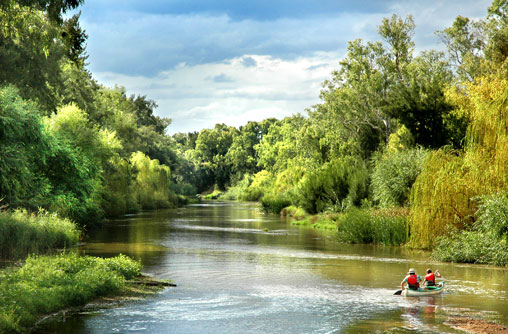
- Kendal Street The welcome sign on the Mid-Western Highway Canola fields The Lachlan River

- Interactive map of Cowra
- Coordinates: 33°50′02″S 148°42′00″E
- Country: Australia
- State: New South Wales
- LGA: Cowra Shire
- Location: 72 km (45 mi) SW of Orange; 96 km (60 mi) SW of Bathurst; 170 km (110 mi) N of Canberra; 305 km (190 mi) W of Sydney
- Established: 1846

Government
  - State electorate: Cootamundra
  - Federal division: Riverina
- Elevation: 310 m (1,020 ft)

Population
  - Total: 8,254 (2021 census)
- Time zone: UTC+10 (AEST)
  - Summer (DST): UTC+11 (AEDT)
- Postcode: 2794
- County: Forbes, Bathurst
- Gazetted: 1849
- Mean max temp: 23.0 °C (73.4 °F)
- Mean min temp: 8.3 °C (46.9 °F)
- Annual rainfall: 598.3 mm (23.56 in)

Cowra (/ˈkaʊrə/) is a town in the Central West region of New South Wales, Australia. It is the largest population centre and the council seat for the Cowra Shire, with a population of 8,254.

Cowra is located approximately 310 m (1,017 ft) above sea level, on the banks of the Lachlan River, in the Lachlan Valley. By road it is approximately 310 km (193 mi) west of the state capital, Sydney, and 189 km (117 mi) north of the nation's capital, Canberra. The town is situated at the intersection of three state highways: the Mid-Western Highway, Olympic Highway and the Lachlan Valley Way.

Cowra is included in the rainfall recorder and weather forecast region for the Central West Slopes and Plains division of the Bureau of Meteorology forecasts.

== History ==
=== Prisoner of war camp ===
During World War II, Cowra was the site of a prisoner of war (POW) camp. Most of the detainees were captured Japanese and Italian military personnel. However, in July 1942, Indonesian political prisoners from the Dutch Tanahmerah prison on the Digul river, in West Papua, were transported as "prisoners-of-war" to the Cowra prison camp, at the behest of Netherlands East Indies government-in-exile (with others who were ill being sent to Liverpool). These Indonesian prisoners arrived in mid 1942 and were released on 7 December 1943, and subsequent to their release, played an important role in the black bans that effectively frustrated the Dutch reimposition of colonial rule in the Indies.

==== The Cowra breakout ====
On 5 August 1944, at least 545 Japanese POWs attempted a mass breakout from the camp. Simultaneously, other Japanese prisoners committed suicide, or were killed by their countrymen, inside the camp.

The actions of the POWs in storming machine gun posts, armed only with improvised weapons, showed what Prime Minister John Curtin described as a "suicidal disregard of life".

During the breakout and subsequent recapture of POWs, four Australian guards and 231 Japanese died, and 108 prisoners were wounded. The dead Japanese were buried in Cowra in the specially created Japanese War Cemetery. This is the only such cemetery in Australia, and also holds some of the dead from the World War II air raids on Darwin.

An Avenue of Honour also commemorates those who died in World War I. There is an annual ceremony to commemorate the breakout, involving local school students, council members, local dignitaries and guest Japanese visitors.

== Heritage listings ==
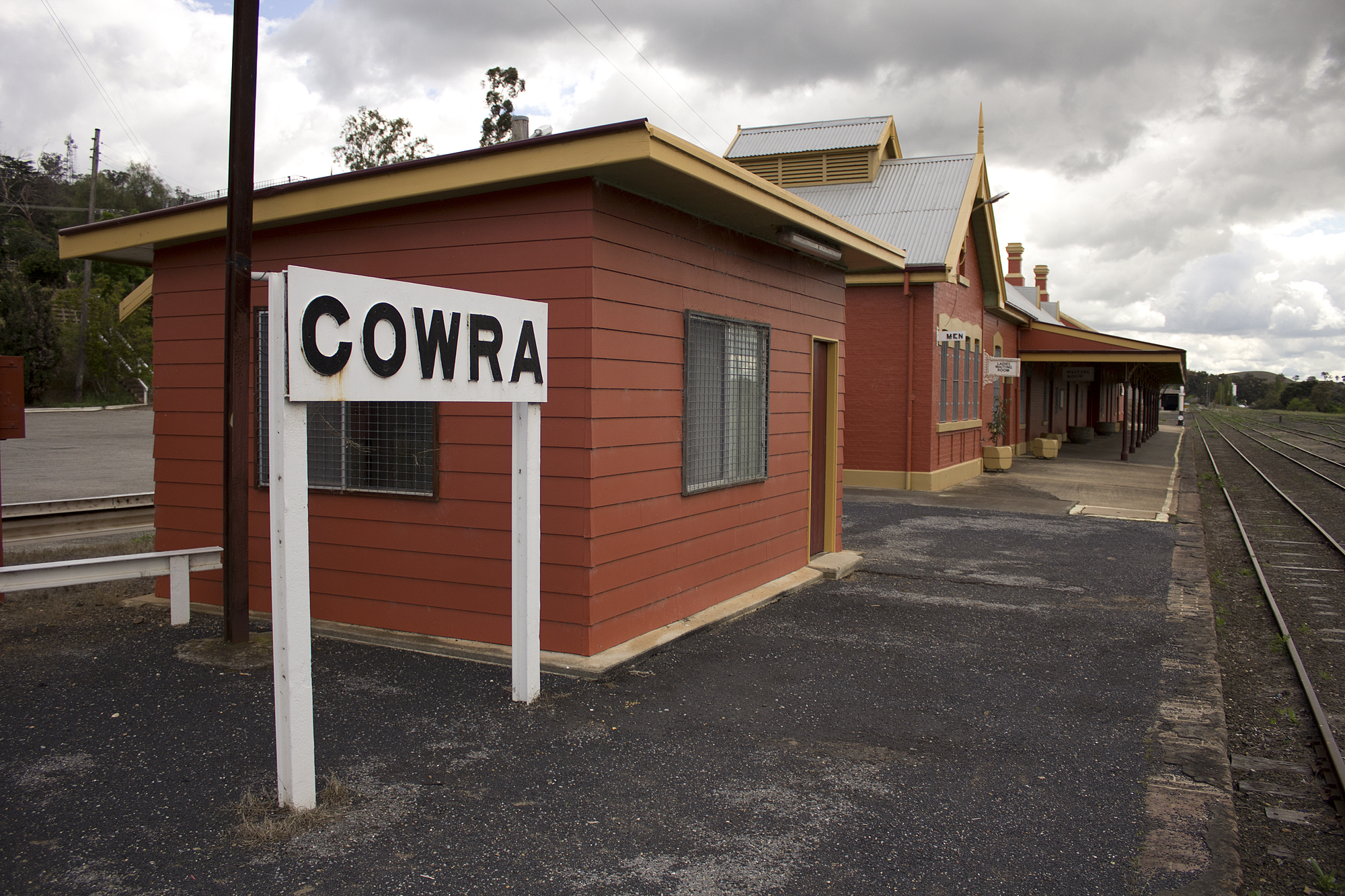
Cowra railway station

Cowra has a number of heritage-listed sites, including:

- Blayney-Demondrille railway line: Lachlan River railway bridge, Cowra
- Blayney-Demondrille railway line: Cowra railway station
- Evans Street: Cowra Prisoner of War Camp Site

According to the 2016 census, there were 10,063 people in Cowra.

- Italian people made up 5% of the population.
- 85.2% of people were born in Australia. The next most common country of birth was England at 1.4%.
- 89.0% of people spoke only English at home.
- The most common responses for religion were Catholic 29.7%, Anglican 26.0% and no religion 16.0%.

== Education ==
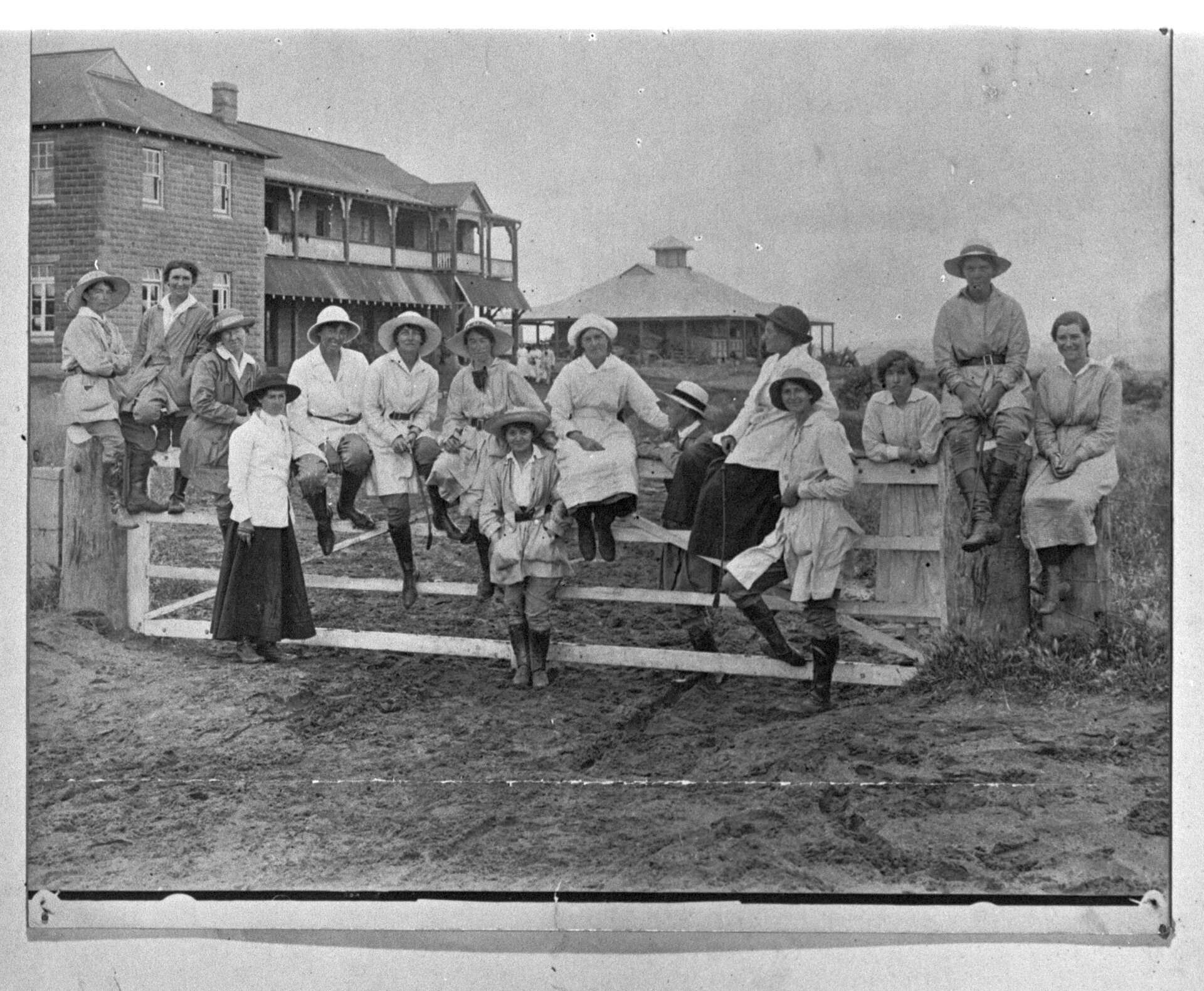
Women training at the Cowra Experiment Farm, 1919

Primary schools

- Cowra Public School
- Mulyan Public School
- Holman Place Public School
- St Raphael's Catholic School (K–6)

Secondary schools

- Cowra High School (7–12)
- St Raphael's Catholic School (7–12)

Cowra also has a campus of the Western Institute of TAFE.

== Media ==
=== Radio stations ===
Radio stations with transmitters located in or nearby to Cowra include:

AM:

- ABC Local Radio 549 AM
- 2LF 1350 AM

FM:

- Hit Network 105.9 FM
- Triple M Central West 105.1 FM
- Roccy FM 99.5 FM
- ABC Classic 102.7 FM
- Radio National 104.3 FM
- FM107.5 107.5 FM
- Triple J (2JJJ) 101.9 FM

=== Television ===
Cowra receives five free-to-air television networks and their affiliates which are relayed from Orange, and broadcast from nearby Mount Canobolas:

- ABC – ABC TV, ABC Family, ABC Kids, ABC Entertains and ABC News
- SBS – SBS TV, SBS2, SBS Food, NITV, SBS World Movies and SBS WorldWatch
- Seven Network – Seven, 7two, 7mate, 7Bravo, 7flix, TVSN and Racing.com
- Network 10 – 10 HD, 10 Drama, 10 Comedy, Nickelodeon and News24 Regional
- WIN – 9HD, 9Gem, 9Go!, 9Life and Gold
- Local half-hour long news bulletins are broadcast by Seven and WIN but Network 10 shows local news updates instead from its Hobart studios.

=== Print ===
The local newspaper is the Cowra Guardian, published by Australian Community Media.

== Viticulture ==
Viticulture is a significant industry in the Cowra area. The first vineyards were planted in the 1970s and were predominantly Chardonnay. Since this time, a range of varieties have had success, including Mourvedre and Tempranillo.

== Transport ==
Cowra lies at the intersection of three highways: the Mid-Western Highway, Olympic Highway, and the Lachlan Valley Way.

Cowra was a major rail centre, being the focal point of the Blayney-Demondrille railway line as well as the junction for branch lines to Eugowra and Grenfell.

The Cowra to Blayney section was closed in the 1980s by the State Rail Authority, before being reopened by the Lachlan Valley Railway as a heritage railway in September 1993, before closing again in April 1997 after a bridge was destroyed by fire. In April 2000, the section reopened in a project funded by the Government of New South Wales. It closed again without ever having gained a regular source of traffic. The Cowra to Demondrille section closed in 2007.

== Climate ==
Under the Köppen climate classification, Cowra has a humid subtropical (Cfa) climate, with a cold semi-arid (BSk) influence. Average maximum temperatures ranging from 32 °C (90 °F) in high summer to 14 °C (57 °F) in mid winter, while minima range from 16 °C (61 °F) to 2 °C (36 °F).

Cowra sits on the border zone between the cool, wet highlands of the Great Dividing Range and the hot, dry plains of western New South Wales. As a result, Cowra experiences climate characteristics of both regions: with cold sub-10 °C maximum temperatures, frequent frost and even snow in winter, and frequent 40+ °C temperatures in summer. Other towns that experience this "border" climate are Inverell and Mudgee further north, Yass and Tumut further south, Corryong in Victoria and Dalby in Queensland.

Rainfall is mild and distributed fairly evenly all year round, however it slightly peaks in summer with thunderstorms and again in winter with cold fronts. The average annual rainfall is 598.3 mm (24 in), while Cowra's wettest month on record was January 1984, with 371.0 mm (15 in) recorded. Extreme temperatures have ranged from 46.6 °C (116 °F) to −8.0 °C (18 °F). Cowra is considerably sunny, having 145.8 clear days on an annual basis.

Climate data for Cowra Airport Comparison (1966–2011); 300 m AMSL; 33.85° S, 148.65° E
Month	Jan	Feb	Mar	Apr	May	Jun	Jul	Aug	Sep	Oct	Nov	Dec	Year
Record high °C (°F)	46.6 (115.9)	44.2 (111.6)	39.5 (103.1)	36.0 (96.8)	27.0 (80.6)	24.0 (75.2)	22.0 (71.6)	34.4 (93.9)	33.5 (92.3)	36.7 (98.1)	43.8 (110.8)	41.8 (107.2)	46.6 (115.9)
Mean daily maximum °C (°F)	32.2 (90.0)	31.4 (88.5)	28.1 (82.6)	23.6 (74.5)	18.6 (65.5)	14.7 (58.5)	13.7 (56.7)	15.5 (59.9)	18.6 (65.5)	22.7 (72.9)	26.7 (80.1)	30.2 (86.4)	23.0 (73.4)
Mean daily minimum °C (°F)	15.6 (60.1)	15.6 (60.1)	12.5 (54.5)	8.3 (46.9)	5.1 (41.2)	3.1 (37.6)	2.1 (35.8)	2.8 (37.0)	4.5 (40.1)	7.0 (44.6)	10.2 (50.4)	13.1 (55.6)	8.3 (46.9)
Record low °C (°F)	5.0 (41.0)	5.0 (41.0)	0.6 (33.1)	−3.0 (26.6)	−5.0 (23.0)	−5.5 (22.1)	−8.0 (17.6)	−6.0 (21.2)	−3.0 (26.6)	−2.0 (28.4)	−2.0 (28.4)	2.0 (35.6)	−8.0 (17.6)
Average rainfall mm (inches)	59.6 (2.35)	52.9 (2.08)	40.4 (1.59)	42.8 (1.69)	46.3 (1.82)	40.5 (1.59)	52.5 (2.07)	47.8 (1.88)	52.5 (2.07)	56.3 (2.22)	53.3 (2.10)	53.4 (2.10)	598.3 (23.56)
Average rainy days (≥ 0.2mm)	6.5	5.7	5.8	5.5	7.6	9.4	11.0	10.2	9.1	8.2	7.8	6.5	93.3
Average afternoon relative humidity (%)	34	37	39	44	54	63	62	57	53	47	39	32	47
Source: Bureau of Meteorology

== Retail ==
Cowra has a wide variety of retailers both large and small, including:

- Coles – supermarket
- Woolworths – supermarket
- Aldi – supermarket
- Bunnings – hardware
- The Reject Shop – discount variety store
- Total Tools

== Japanese War Cemetery ==
A cemetery was initially created holding the 231 prisoners who died in the Cowra Breakout and was tended by members of the Cowra RSL after World War II. The site is next to the Australian War Cemetery, which houses local servicemen, personnel who died in the area, and four of the guards of the Cowra breakout. There are also a few Indonesian prisoner graves of people who were detained by the Dutch authorities.

Formalisation of the site as an official war grave began in 1959 and the site opened as the Japanese War Cemetery on 22 November 1964. Eventually, 524 bodies were interred there, including civilian internees and all other Japanese combatants who were buried in other parts of Australia (since their graves were later moved there). Not all dead were Japanese nationals, but include 25 Taiwanese and 1 Korean (which at the time were colonies of Japan).

The cemetery is on Crown land owned by the New South Wales government under trusteeship of the Commonwealth War Graves Commission. Use of the land, was granted to Japan in 1963 on a payment-of-costs basis. In 1971, the Cowra Tourism Development decided to celebrate this link to Japan, and proposed a Japanese garden for the town. The Japanese government agreed to support this development as a sign of thanks for the respectful treatment of their war dead; the development also received funding from the Australian government and private entities.

== Japanese Garden ==
Located 3 kilometres south of the war cemetery is the Cowra Japanese Garden and Cultural Centre. It was designed in 1977 by Ken Nakajima (1914–2000), a "world renowned architect" of Japanese gardens at the time. The first stage was opened in 1979, with a second stage opened in 1986. The gardens were designed in the style of the Edo period and are a komatsu ("small pine-tree") or strolling garden. The rocky hillside, manicured hedges, waterfalls and streams, and the two lakes provide a serene environment for a myriad of birdlife. Special features of the garden include a Bonshō bell, a traditional Edo cottage, an authentic open air tea house and a bonsai house. They are designed to show "A Sense of Season" throughout the year as well as representative landscape types of Japan. At 5 hectares (12 acres), the garden is the largest Japanese garden in the Southern Hemisphere. They were added to the National Trust Register in June 2013.

After cherry trees were planted in 1988, an annual Sakura Matsuri (cherry blossom festival) was first held in 1990 and is an event in Cowra's tourism calendar and is held in the gardens during September. The festival celebrates the birth of spring. Locals, Australian and international visitors alike have the opportunity to experience traditional elements of Japanese culture. Sakura at the Cowra Japanese Garden is celebrated annually when the cherry blossoms are at their peak.

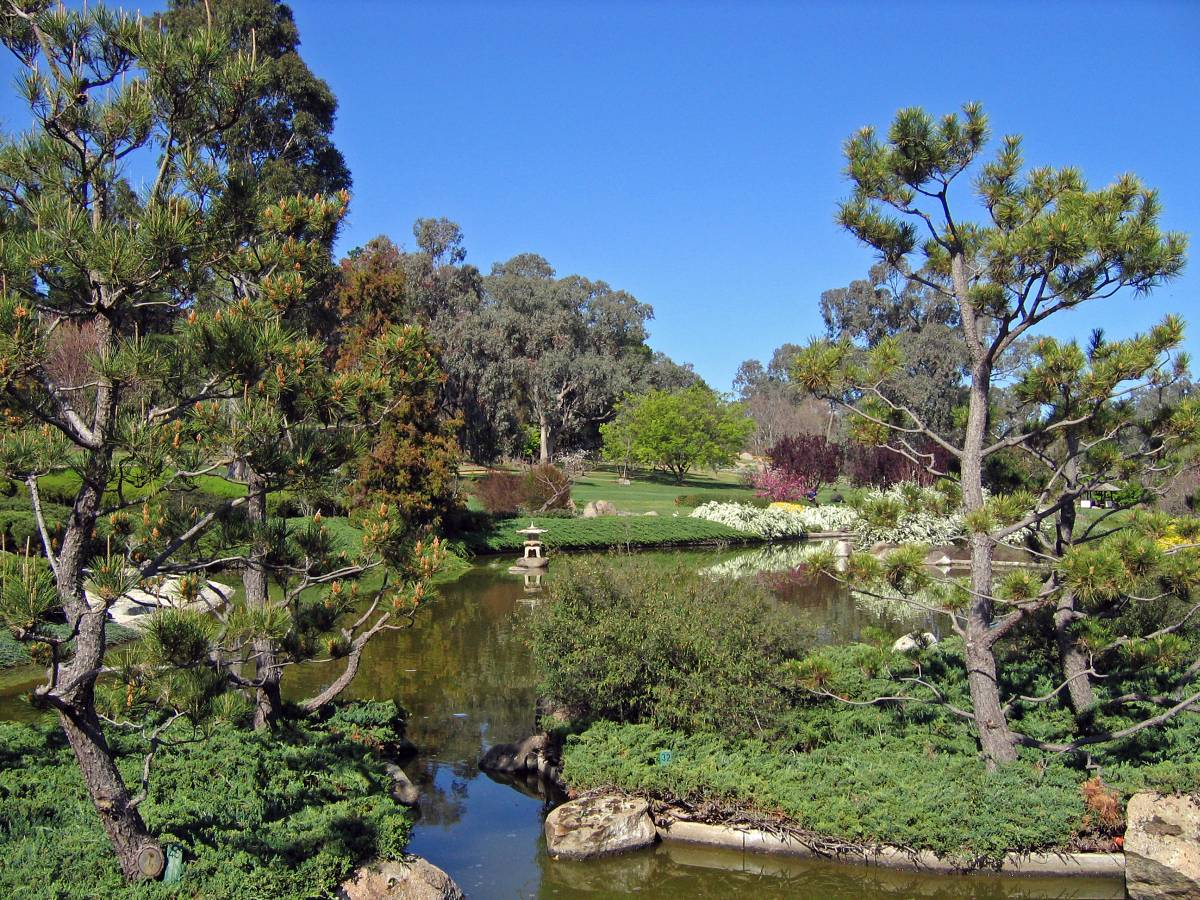
Japanese lake with stone lantern

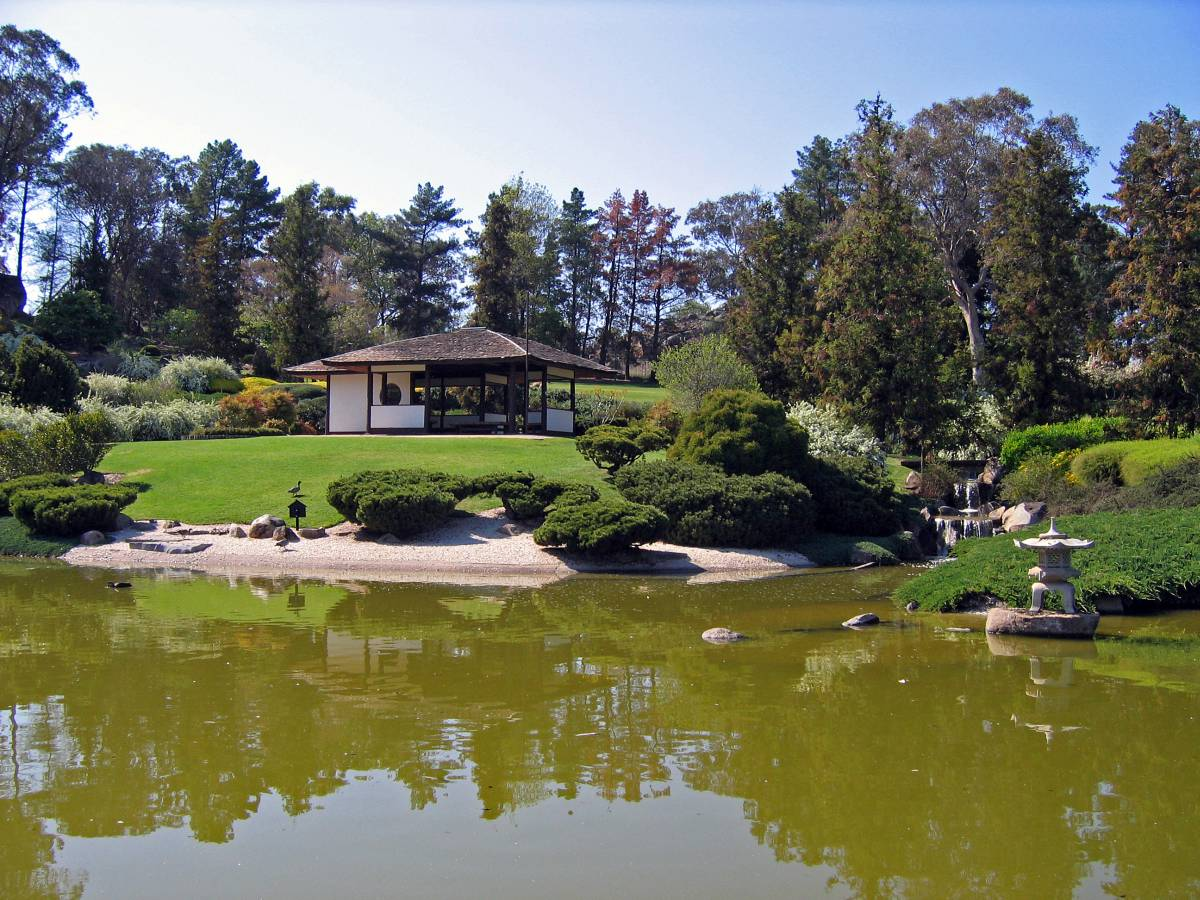
Looking across the lake to the teahouse

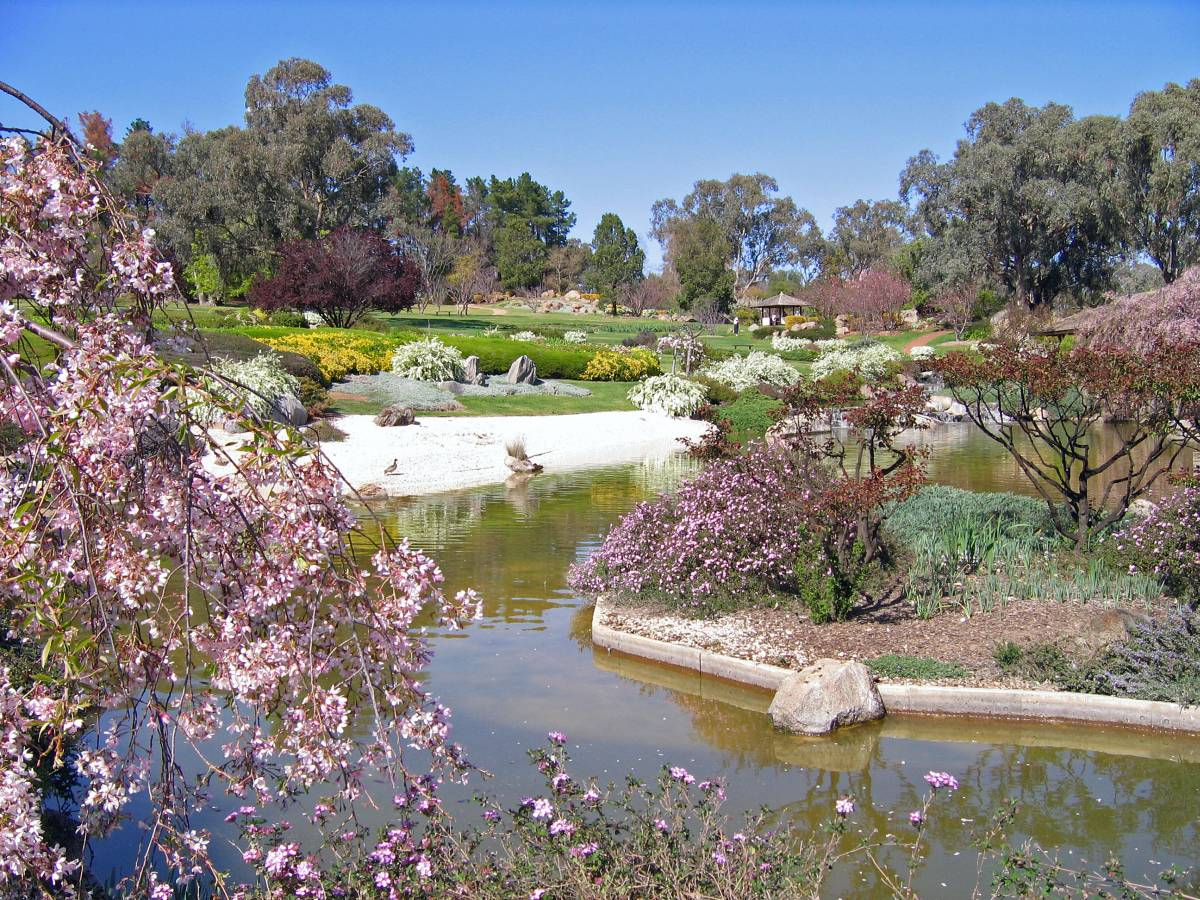
Lower lake with spring blossoms

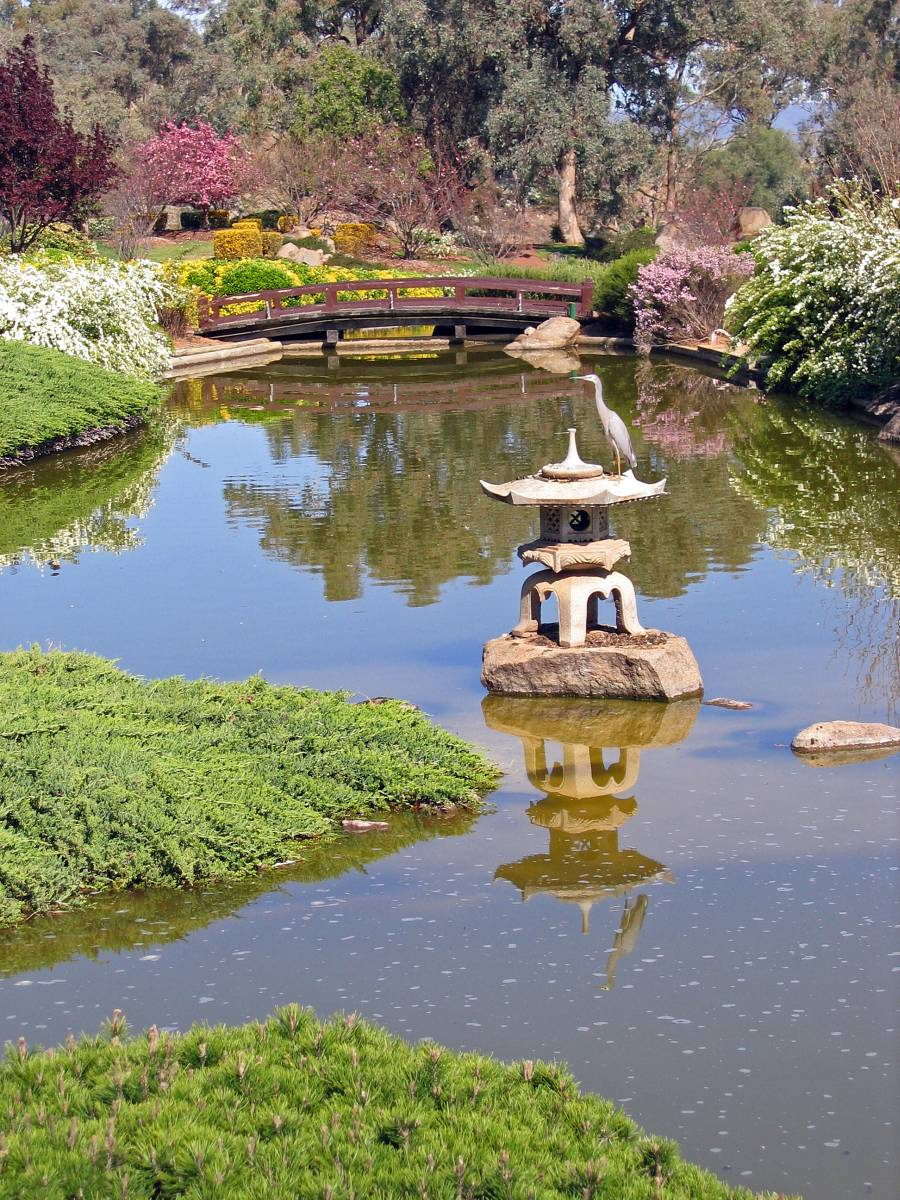
Big bird rests on a stone lantern in the upper lake

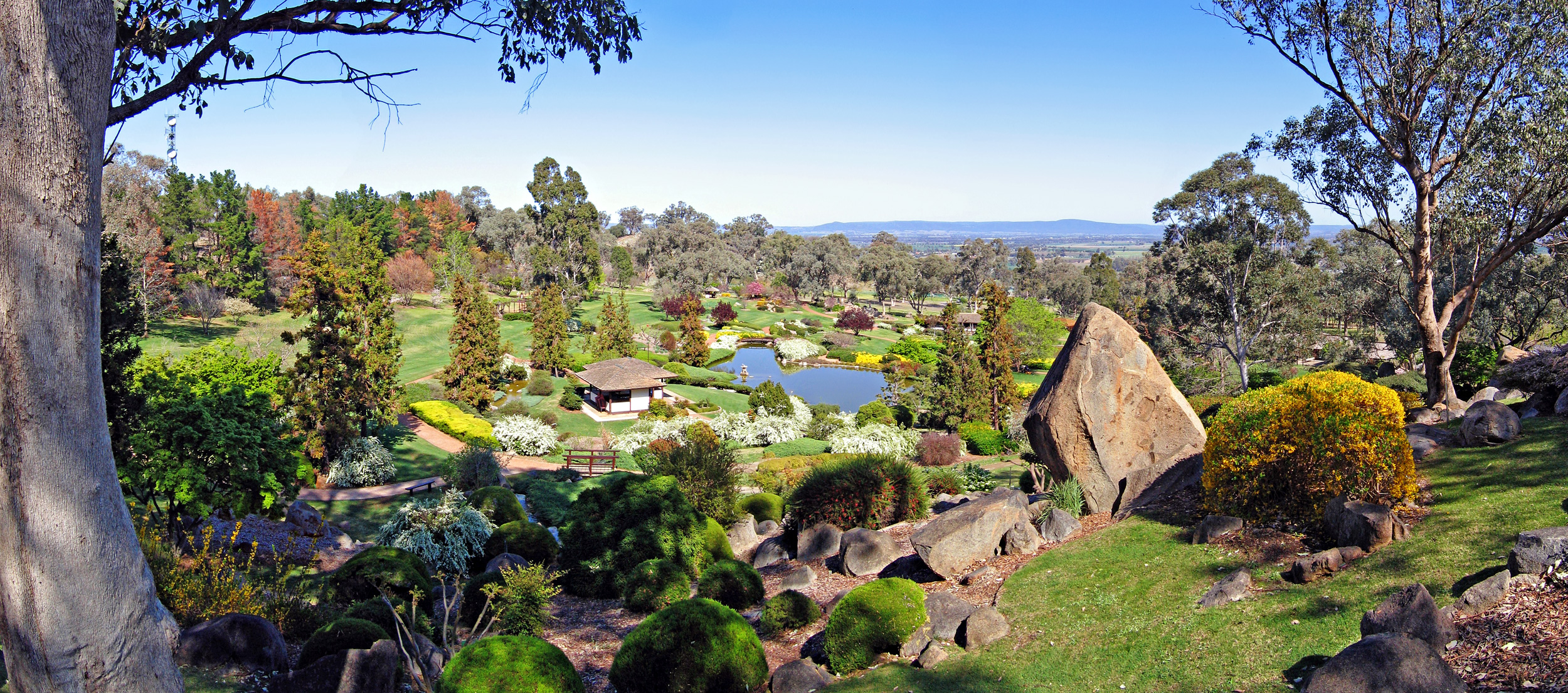
Panoramic view from the Symbolic Mountain at the Japanese Gardens

== Sport ==
The most popular sport in Cowra is rugby league. The local team, the Cowra Magpies, compete in the Peter McDonald Premiership, of which they are a part of the Group 10 Division.

=== Sporting clubs ===
- Cowra Magpies are a rugby league team playing in the Peter McDonald Premiership (Group 10) competition.
- Cowra Eagles are a rugby union team playing in the Central West Rugby Union competition.
- Cowra Blues are an Australian rules football team playing in the AFL Central West competition.
- Cowra Eagles are a soccer club playing in the Orange District Soccer Senior Men's (1st Grade) competition.
- Cowra Netball association play in State Age Championships competition.
- Cowra Squashed Frogs are a hockey team playing in the Western Division.

== Population ==
Historical population
Year	Pop.	±%
1921	3,716	—
1933	5,056	+36.1%
1947	5,473	+8.2%
1954	6,097	+11.4%
1961	6,288	+3.1%
1966	7,076	+12.5%
1971	7,295	+3.1%
1976	7,734	+6.0%
1981	7,900	+2.1%
1986	8,207	+3.9%
1991	8,422	+2.6%
1996	8,544	+1.4%
2001	8,691	+1.7%
2006	8,430	−3.0%
2011	8,107	−3.8%
2016	8,225	+1.5%
2021	8,254	+0.4%
Source: Australian Bureau of Statistics data.

The first European explorer to the area, George William Evans, entered the Lachlan Valley in 1815. He named the area the Oxley Plains after his superior the surveyor-general, John Oxley. In 1817 he deemed the area "rather unfit for settlement". A military depot was established not long after at Soldiers Flat near present-day Billimari. Arthur Ranken and James Sloan, from Bathurst, were amongst the first white settlers on the Lachlan. They moved to the area in 1831.

The township of "Coura Rocks" had its beginnings in 1844. Around 1847, the township site became known as Cowra, and in 1849, was proclaimed a village.

In the 1850s many gold prospectors passed through headed for gold fields at Lambing Flat (Young) and Grenfell. The first school was established in 1857. The first bridge over the Lachlan River was built in 1870. Gold was discovered at Mount McDonald in the 1880s. The rail head from Sydney reached Cowra in 1886. Local government was granted in 1888. The first mobile telephone exchange was established in 1901. The town water supply was established in 1909, the gasworks in 1912 and town supplied electricity was introduced in 1924. From 1904 to 1966 the Cowra Experiment Farm was im operation, experimenting with wheat and with fallow crops.

Cowra hosts an annual Festival of International Understanding, featuring a parade, a fireworks display, balloons for the kids and events showcasing a particular foreign culture. In 2020 it was cancelled due to the COVID-19 pandemic.

=== Notable people ===
- Ellie Carpenter (born 2000), soccer player who plays for Chelsea and for the Australia national team
- John Walsh, mass murderer
