= Orange Community Radio =

FM107.5 - The Local Station (callsign:2OCB) is a community radio station that broadcasts to the city of Orange, New South Wales, Australia and surrounding districts on the frequency 107.5 MHz. The organisation is Orange Community Broadcasters Incorporated. It is one of three community radio stations in the area alongside 2MCE and Rhema FM.

== History ==
FM107.5 was originally known as Apple FM, and operated under a temporary community radio broadcasting licence in the 1980s and most of the 1990s. The current station gained its full community broadcasting licence in January 1998. The station survived an insolvency scare in 2001.

== Programming ==
FM107.5 airs an eclectic mix of programming, including music, arts, Indigenous programming and programming in languages other than English. All locally produced programs are presented by volunteers, with some programming originating from the Community Radio Network (Australia).

== Coverage area ==
FM107.5 is licensed to serve the "Orange RA1" licence area, which is roughly bounded by Cumnock, New South Wales in the north, the outskirts of Bathurst, New South Wales in the east, Cowra, New South Wales in the south and Eugowra, New South Wales in the west. With an effective radiated power of 5 kW and a transmitter on Mount Canobolas (1395 m elevation), the station can sometimes be heard outside of its licence area.
