= Cowra Japanese Garden and Cultural Centre =

Place in New South Wales, Australia

Coordinates: 33°49′35″S 148°41′50″E

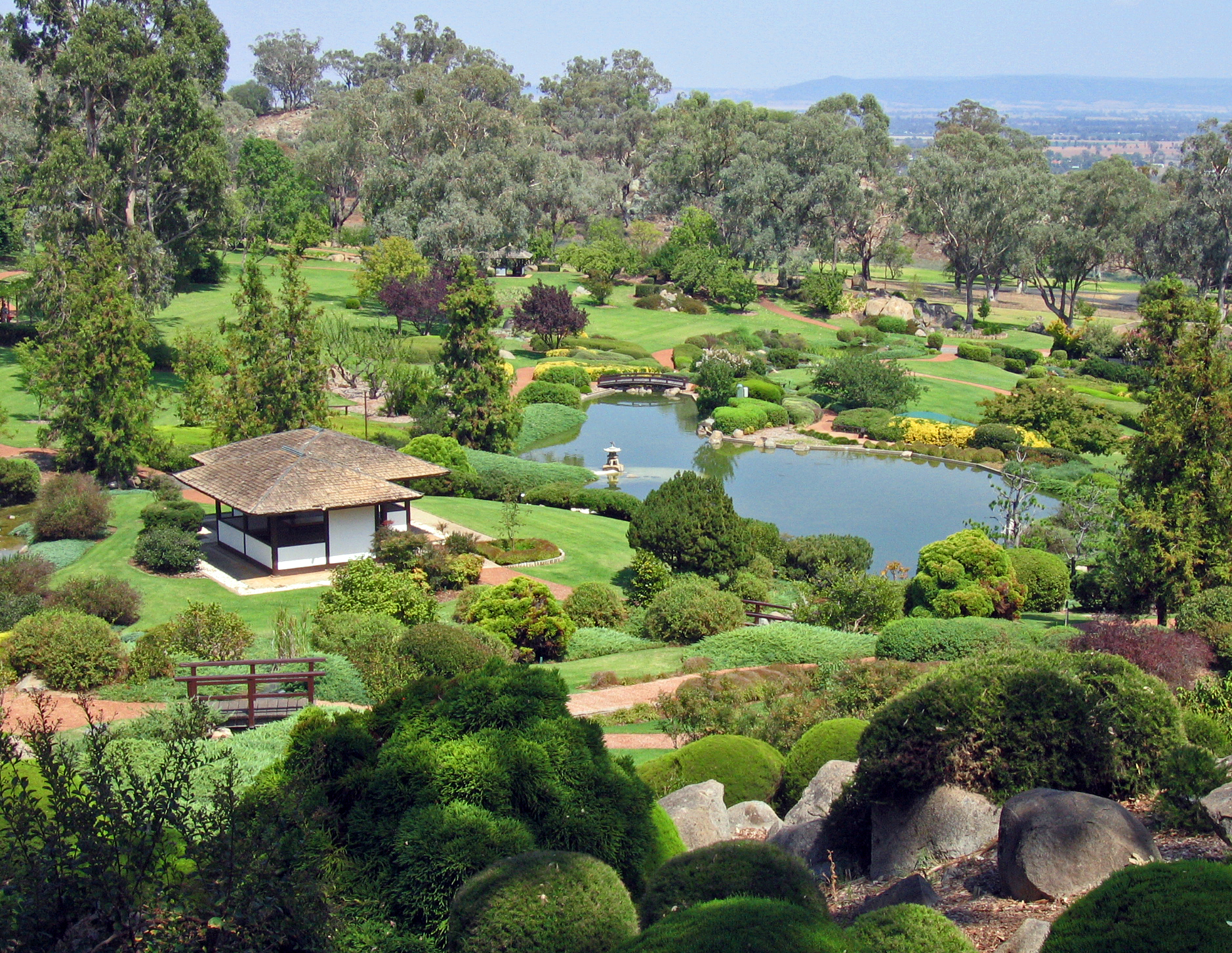
- Interactive map of Cowra Japanese Garden and Cultural Centre
- Type: Japanese garden
- Location: Cowra, New South Wales
- Area: 5 hectares (12 acres)

The Cowra Japanese Garden and Cultural Centre is located in the town of Cowra, in the Central West region of New South Wales, Australia. The 5 ha (12 acres) garden was established to recognise and develop the historic and ongoing relationship between the people of Cowra Shire and the people of Japan.

== Background ==
The garden was designed by Ken Nakajima (1914–2000) in the style of the Edo period as a kaiyū-shiki or strolling garden. The rocky hillside, manicured hedges, waterfalls, streams, and lakes with a variety of aquatic birds. Special features of the garden include a Bonshō (bell), a traditional Edo cottage, an authentic open air tea housethat also sells Japanese delicacies and sweets, and a Bonsai house.

== History ==
In 1960 the Japanese Government decided to bring all their war dead from other parts of Australia to be re-buried at Cowra, which already featured a cemetery for the remains of 231 Japanese soldiers killed during the 1944 Cowra breakout from the nearby prisoner of war camp. The Japanese War Cemetery was maintained after World War II by members of the Cowra Returned and Services League of Australia, and ceded to Japan in 1963.

In 1971 Cowra Tourism Development decided to celebrate this link to Japan, and proposed a Japanese garden for the town. The Japanese government agreed to support this development as a sign of thanks for the respectful treatment of their war dead, with the development also receiving money from the Australian government and private entities.

The Cowra Japanese Garden and Cultural Centre opened in 1979, and the second stage opened in 1986.

== Festivals ==
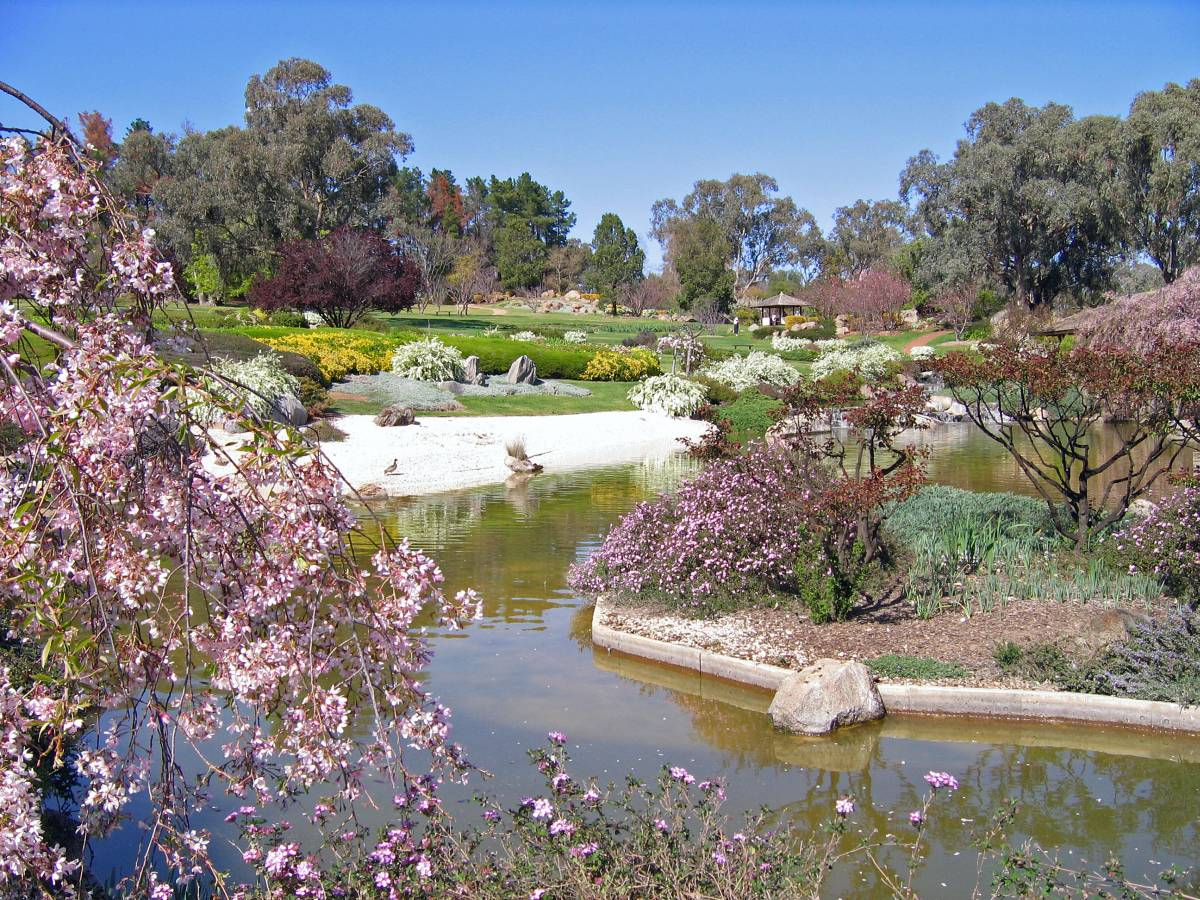
Cowra Japanese Garden in spring

An annual Sakura Matsuri (cherry blossom festival) is held in the gardens during September and celebrates the arrival of spring.

The garden hosts Girl's Day and Boy's Day festivals, tea ceremonies, demonstrations, and workshops on traditional Japanese crafts, including calligraphy, origami, and Ikebana, as well as garden talks.

== Gallery ==
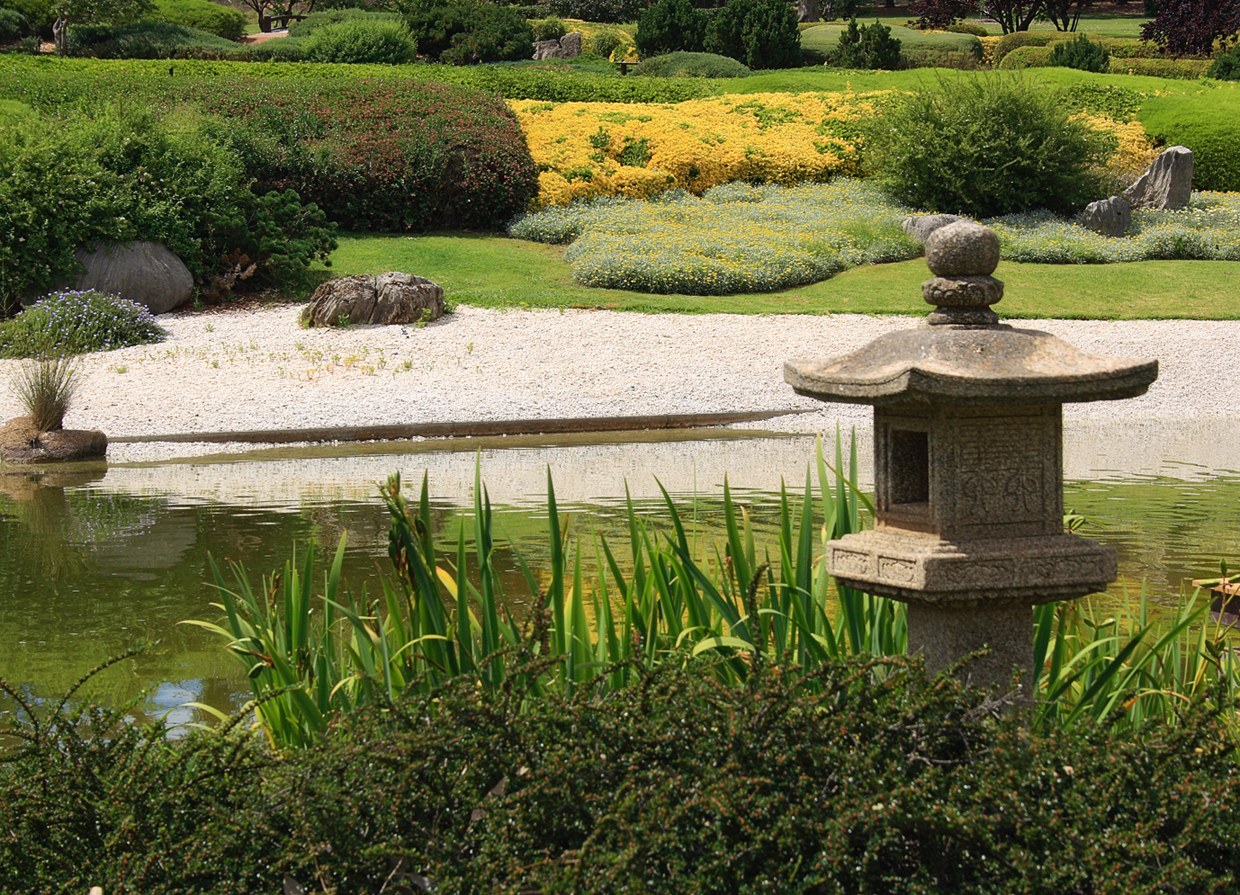

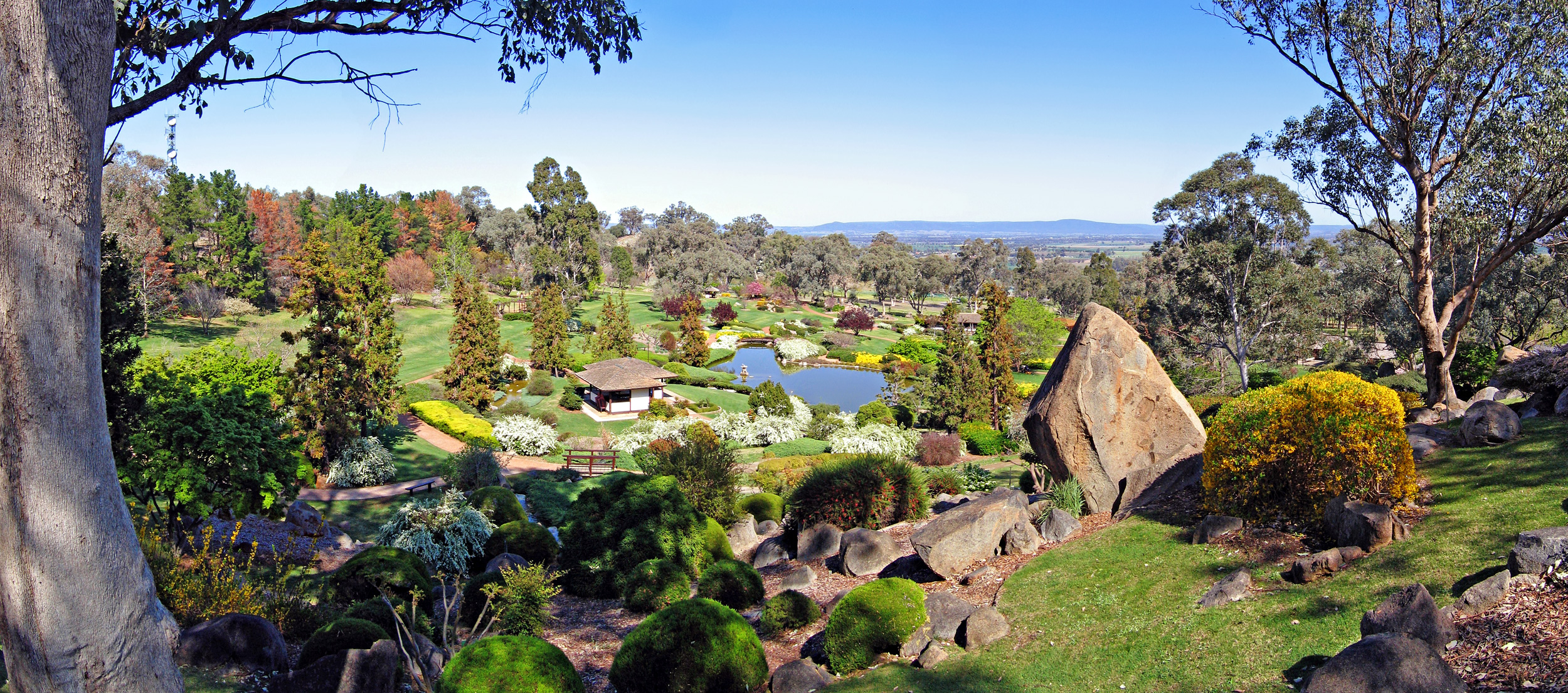

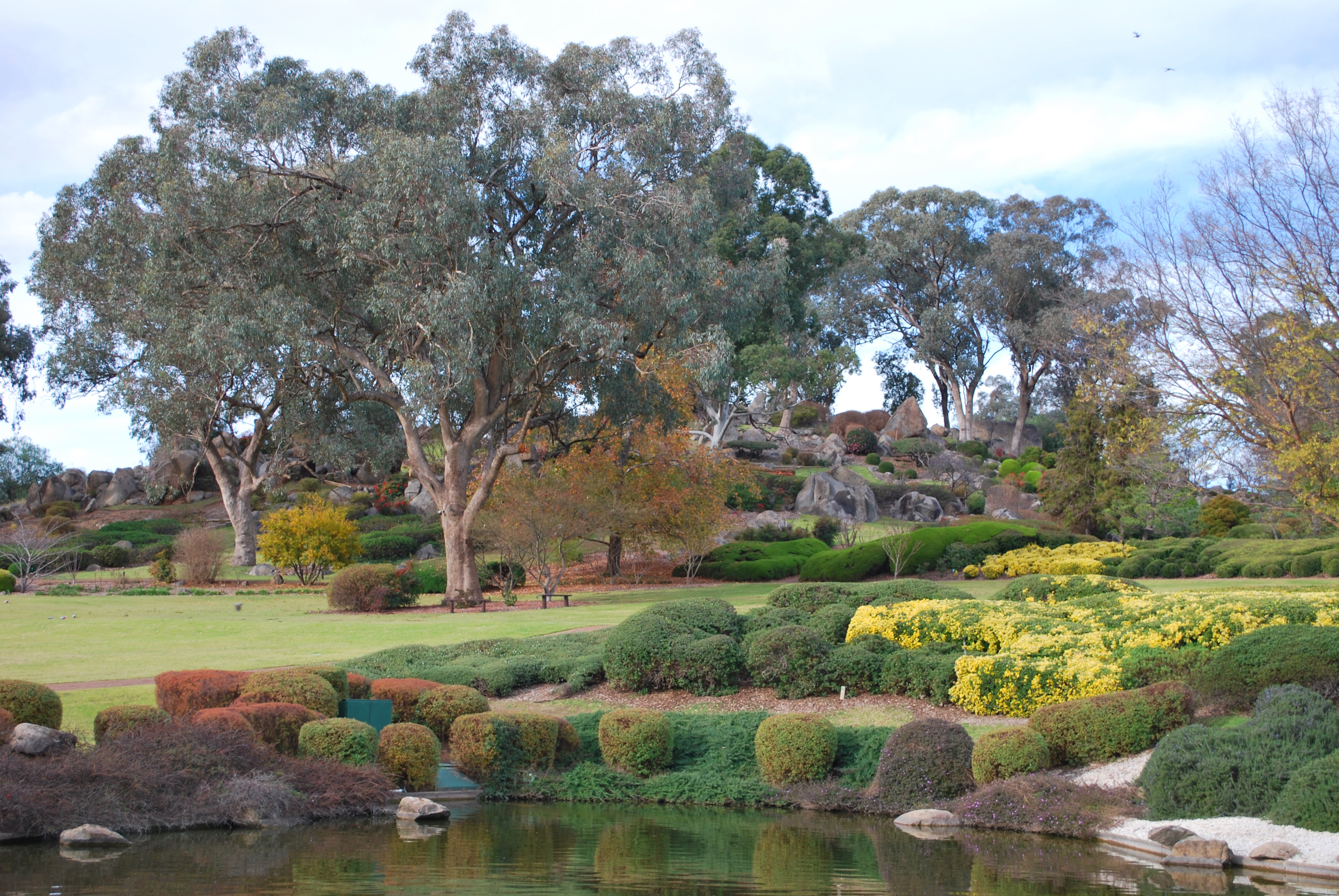

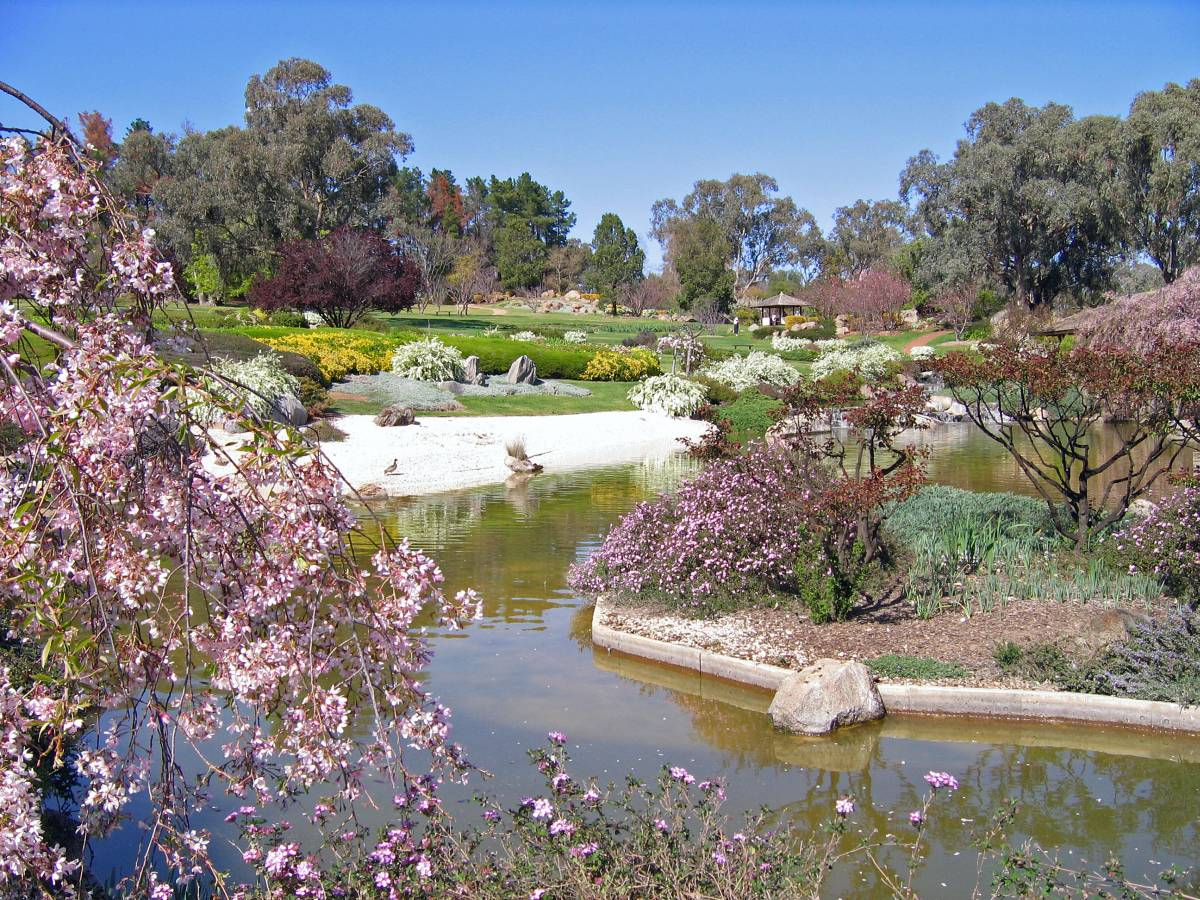

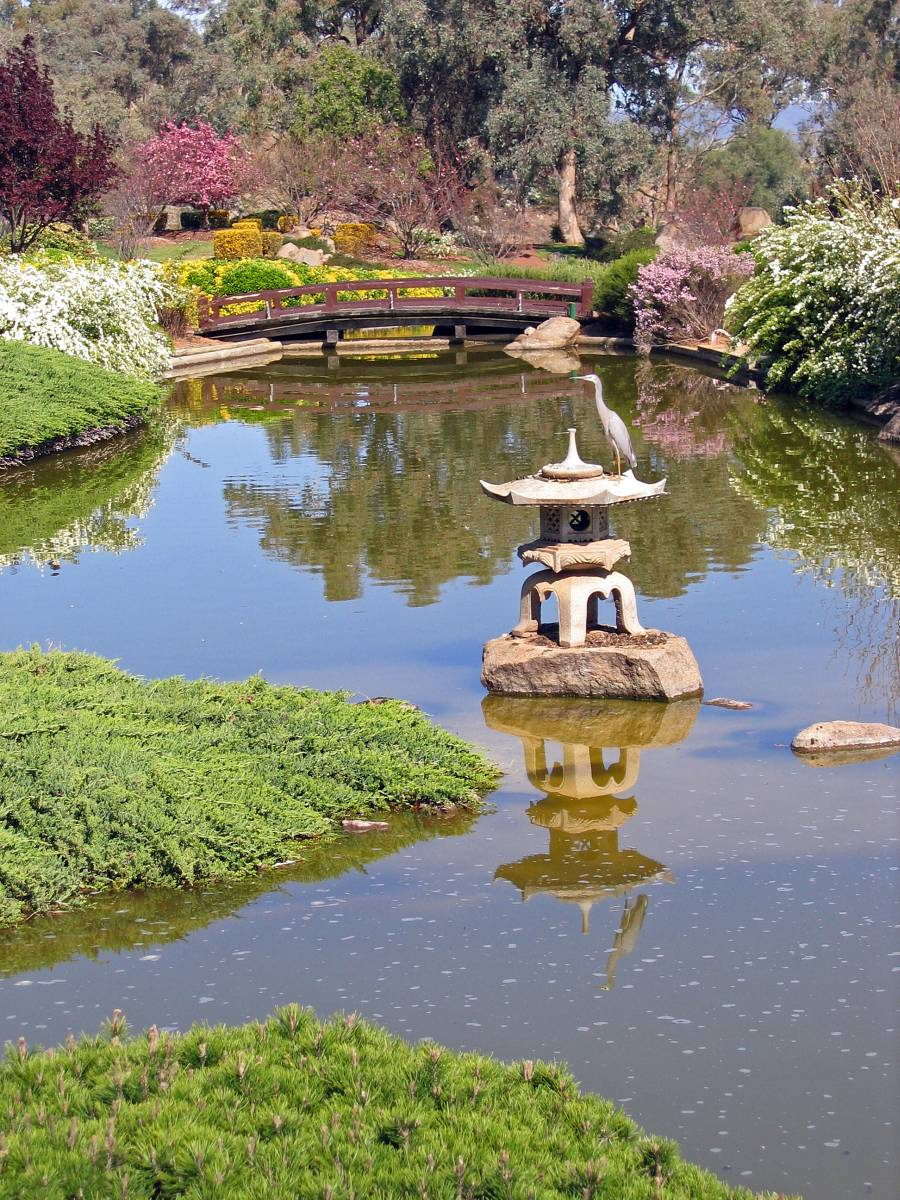

== See also ==
- Mayfield Garden, another garden in Central West NSW
