= Moscow Botanical Garden of Academy of Sciences =

Botanical garden in Moscow, Russia

Coordinates: 55.839°N 37.601°E

The Tsitsin Main Botanical Garden of Academy of Sciences was founded in April 1945, and claims itself to be the largest botanical garden in Europe. It covers a total territory of approximately 3.6 km², bordering the VDNKH Exhibition Center.

== Gallery ==
Main Botanical Garden of Academy of Sciences

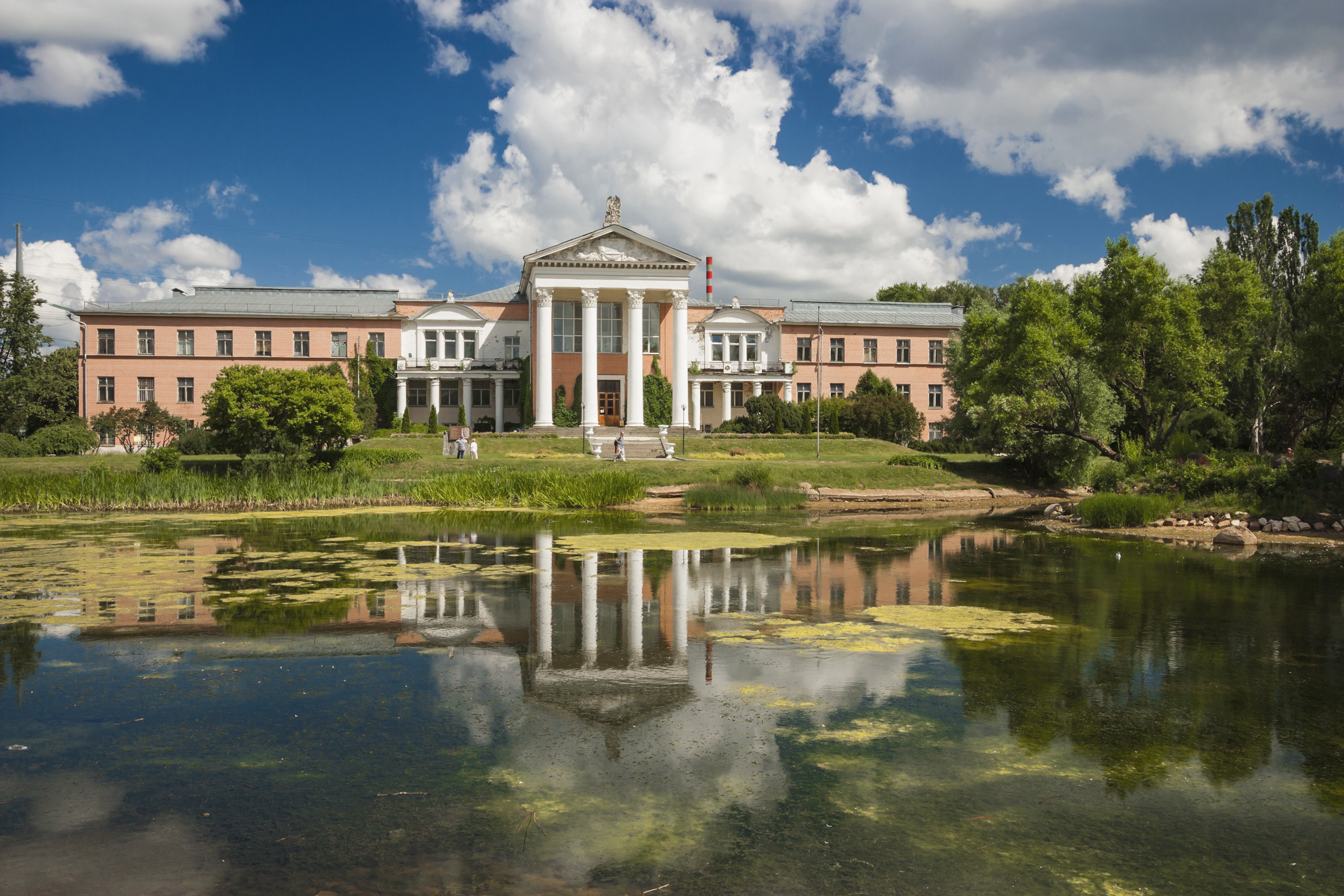
Main botanical garden, main building

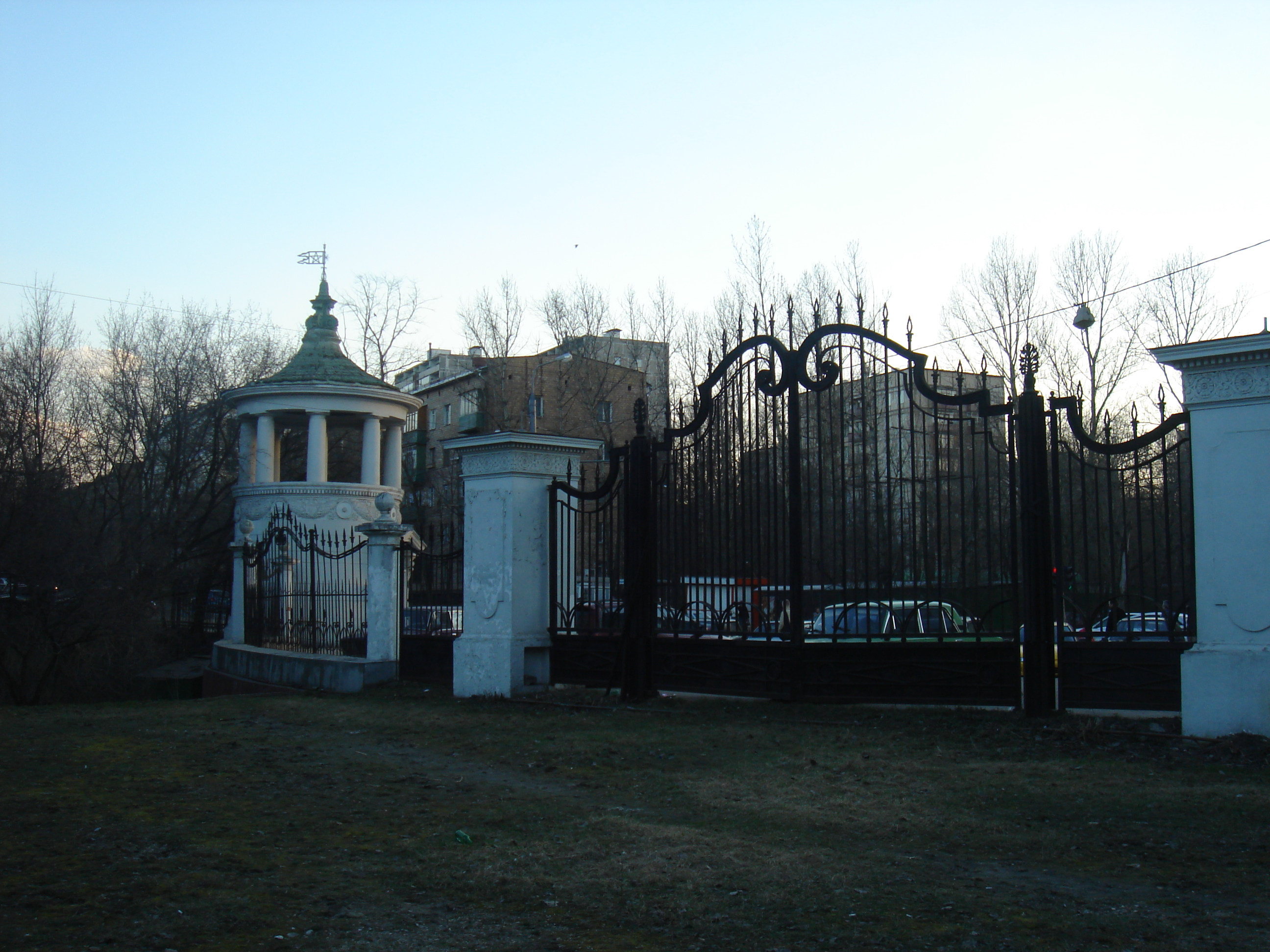
Garden fence

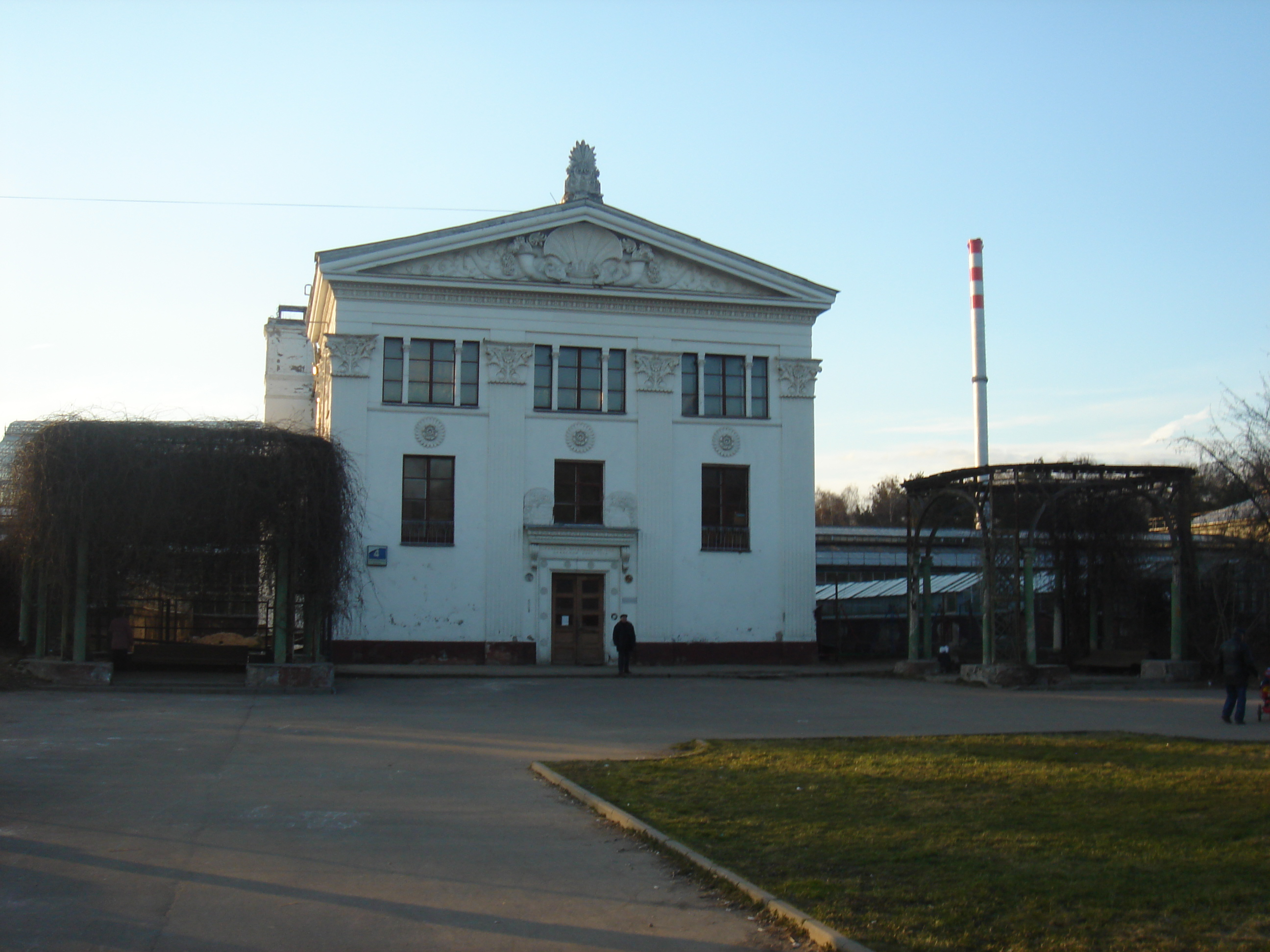
Greenhouse facade

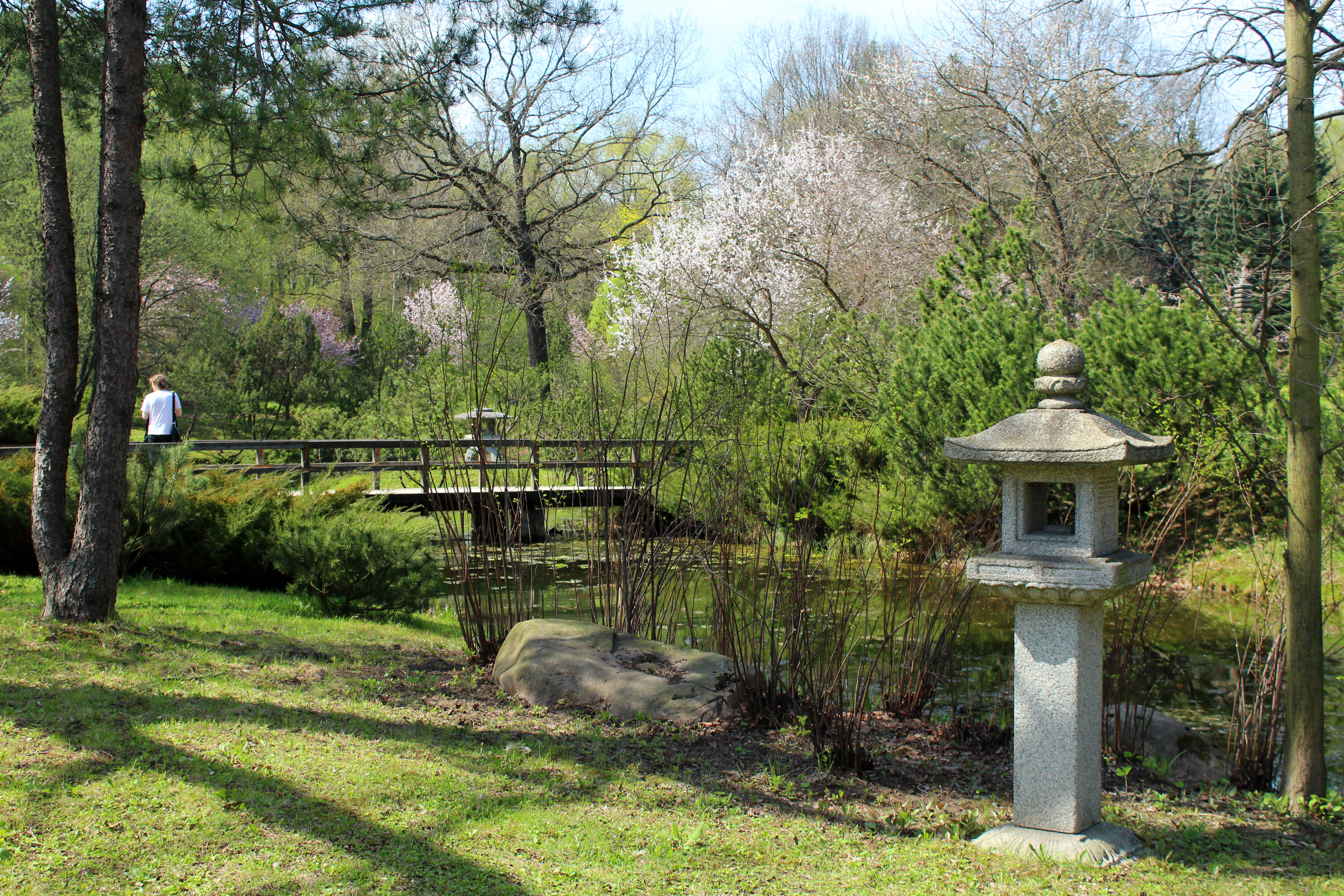
Japanese Garden

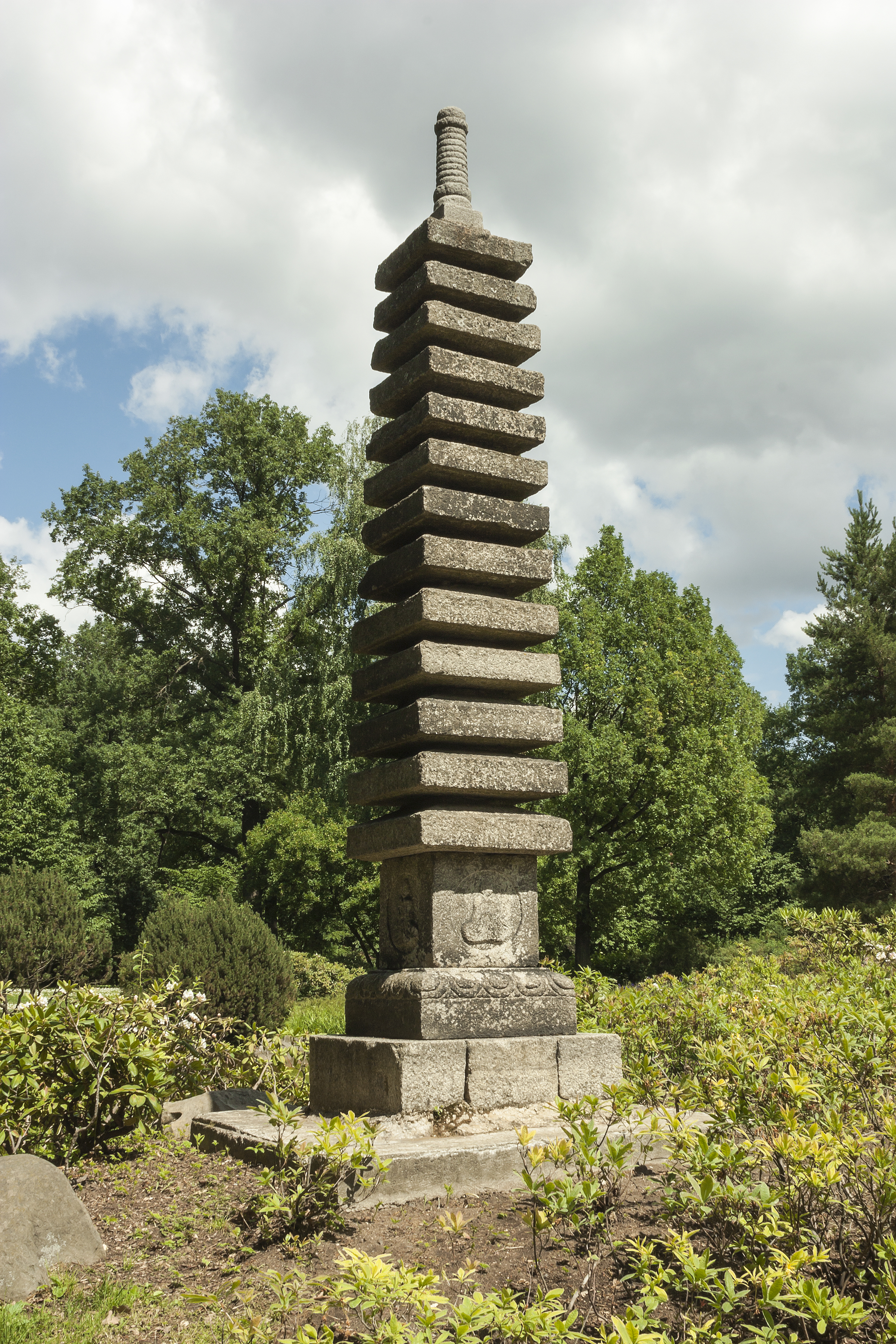
Japanese Garden

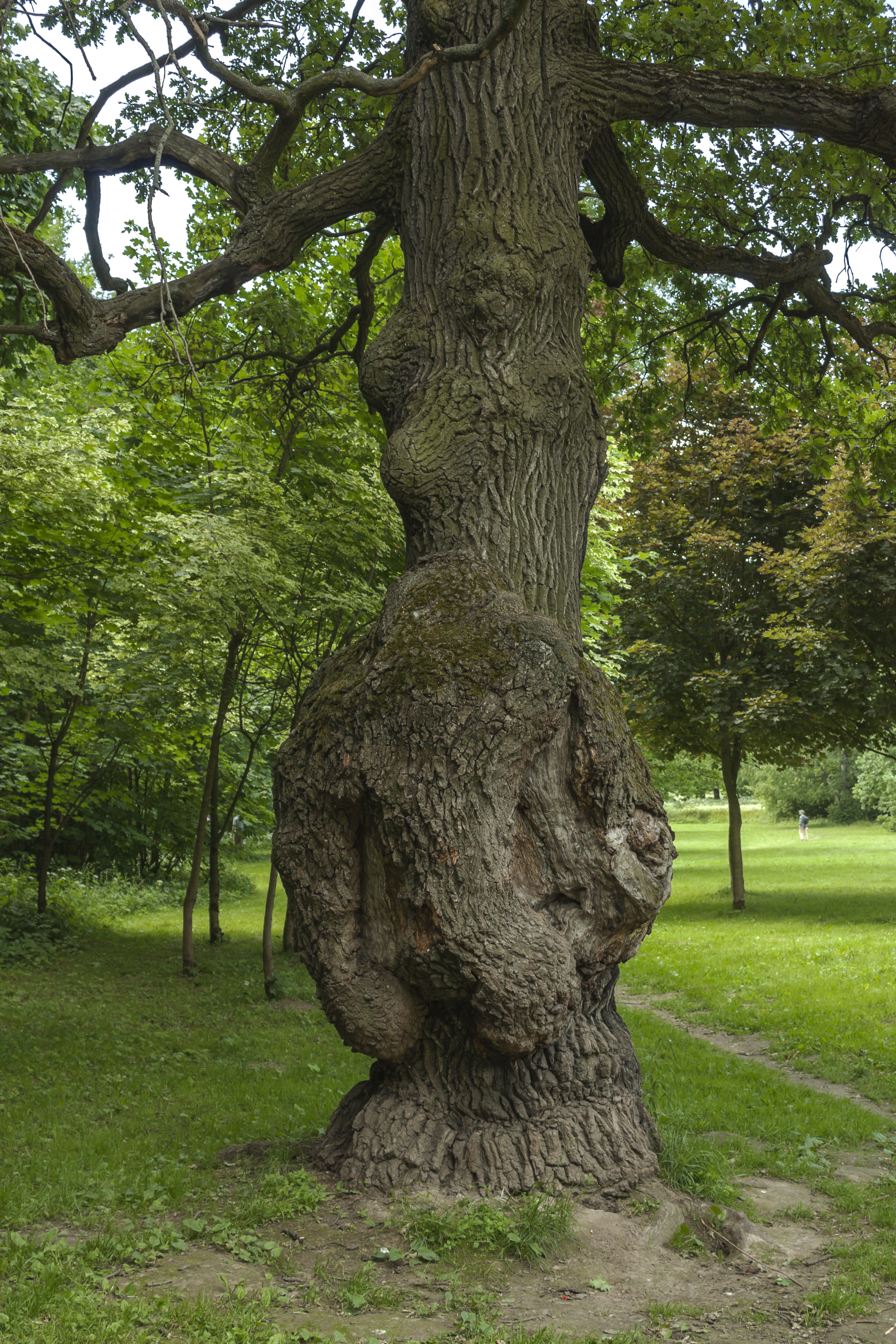
Main Botanical Garden of the Academy of Sciences of Russia

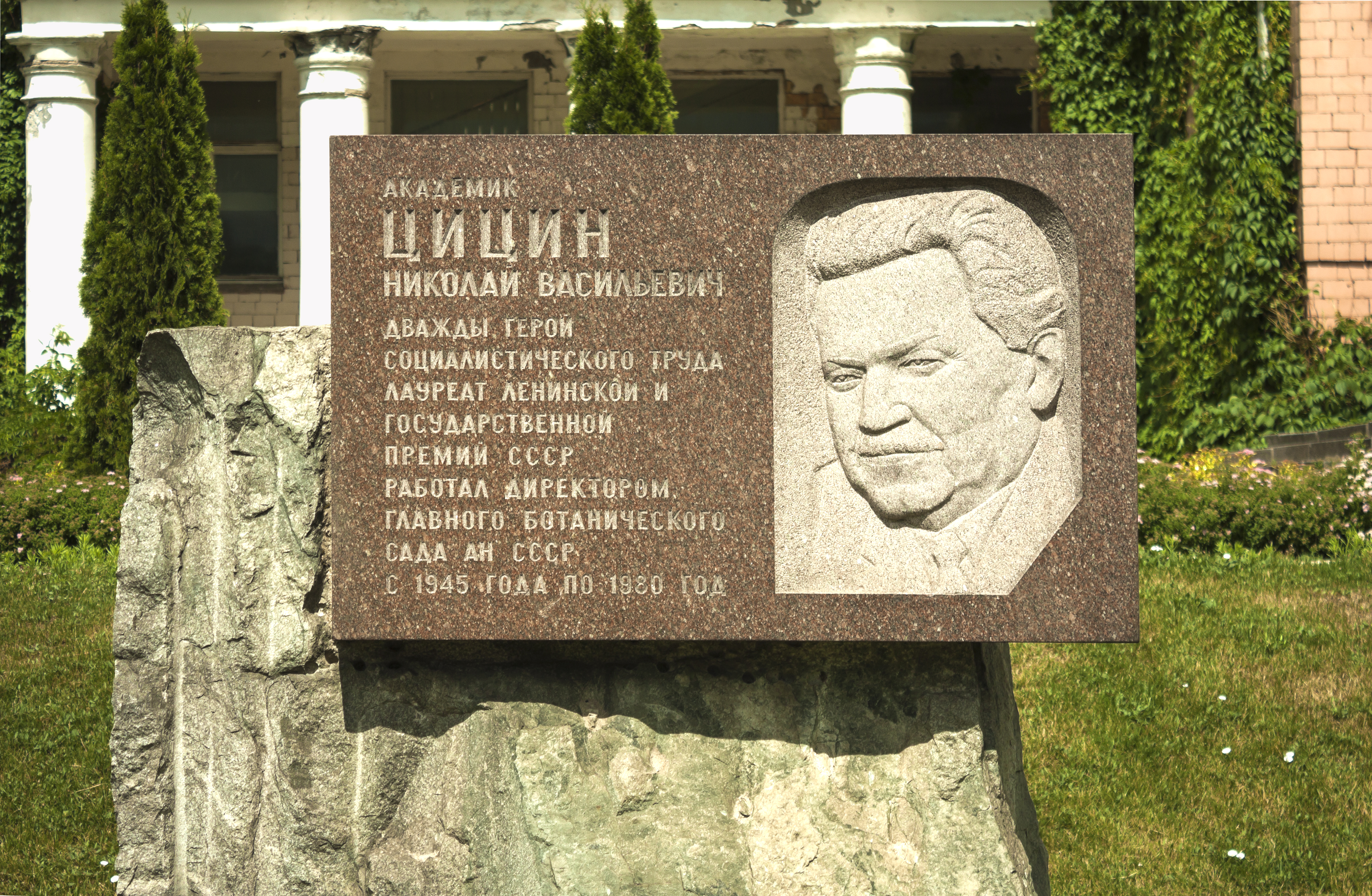
Main Botanical Garden of Russian Academy of Sciences
