= Boydell =

Boydell is an English surname.

Boydell may also refer to:

- Boydell Shakespeare Gallery, museum
- Boydell & Brewer, English book publishing company

- Boydell Press, one of the two companies which merged to form Boydell & Brewer

- William C. Boydell House, in Detroit, Michigan, USA
- Boydell Glacier, on Trinity Peninsula in northern Graham Land in the Antarctic
