= Home front during World War II =

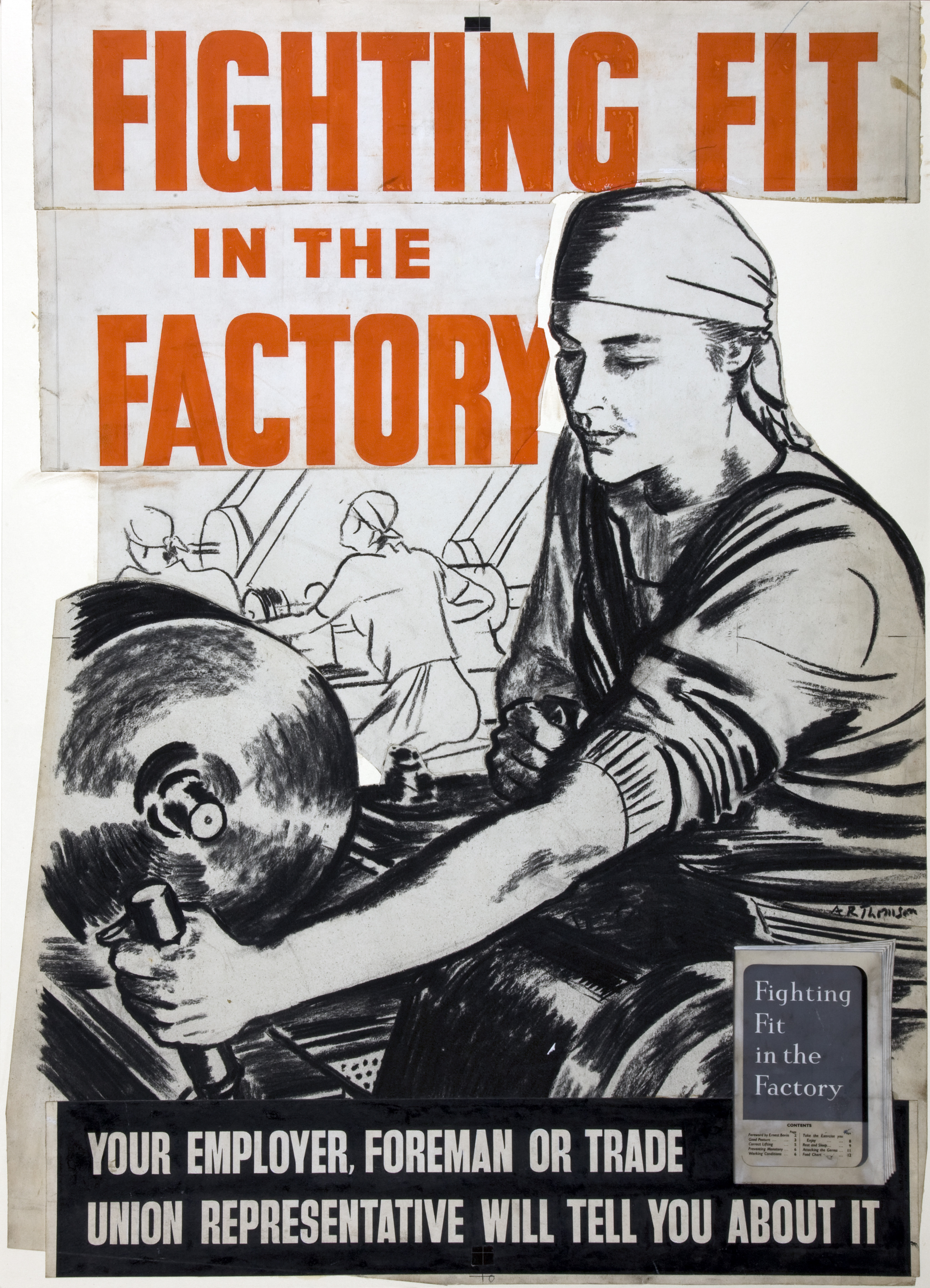
INF3-160 Fighting Fit in the Factory. British poster by A. R. Thomson

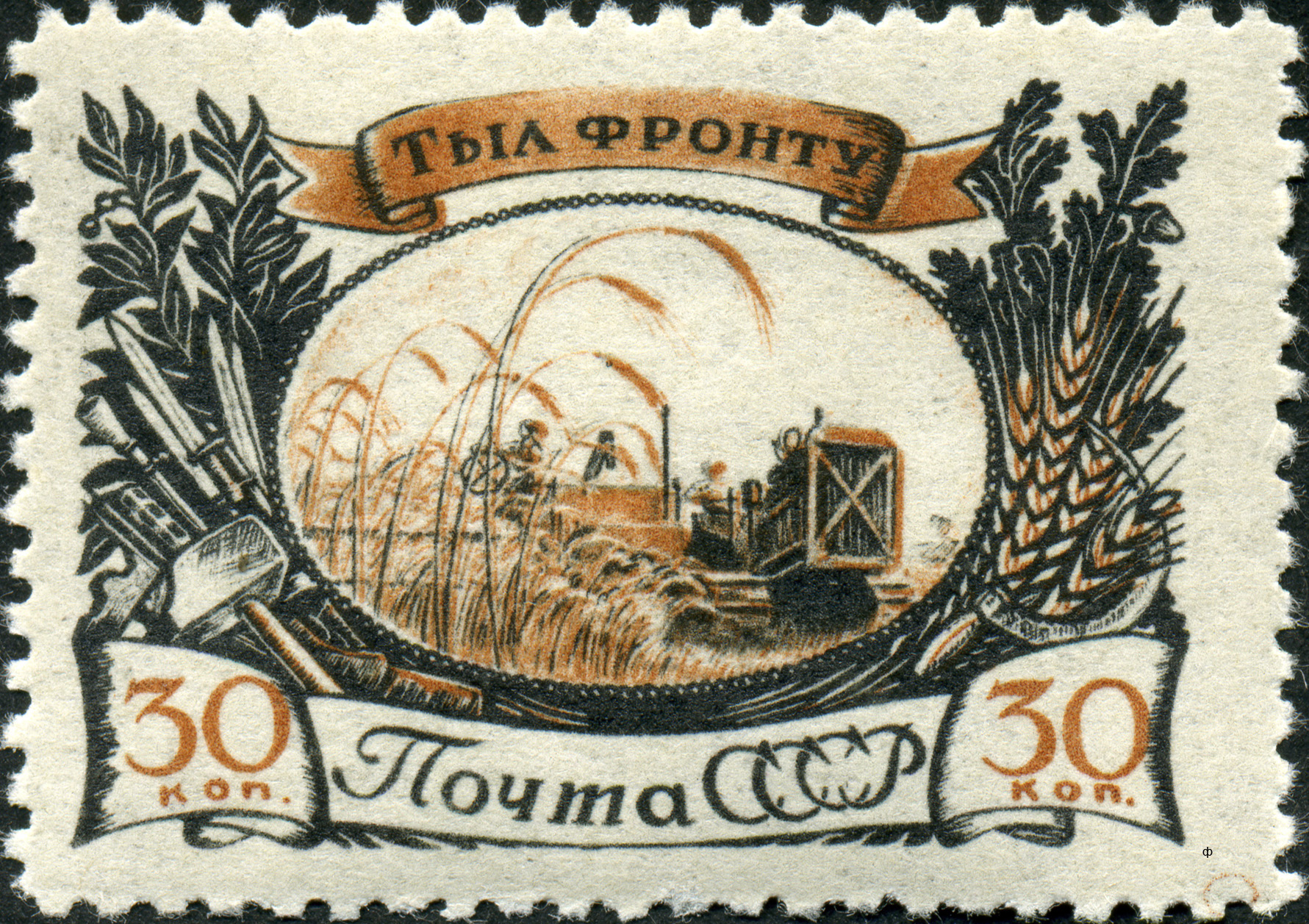
Soviet stamp celebrating the "Rear Front"

The activities of the civilians in a nation at war are referred to as the "home front". World War II was a total war; homeland military production became vital to both the Allied and Axis powers. Life on the home front during World War II was a significant part of the war effort for all participants and had a major impact on the outcome of the war. Governments became involved with new issues such as rationing, manpower allocation, home defense, evacuation in the face of air raids, and response to occupation by an enemy power. The morale and psychology of the people responded to leadership and propaganda. Typically women were mobilized to an unprecedented degree.

All of the powers used lessons from their experiences on the home front during World War I. Their success in mobilizing economic output was a major factor in supporting combat operations. Among morale-boosting activities that also benefited combat efforts, the home front engaged in a variety of scrap drives for materials crucial to the war effort such as metal, rubber, and rags. Such drives helped strengthen civilian morale and support for the war effort. Each country tried to suppress negative or defeatist rumors.

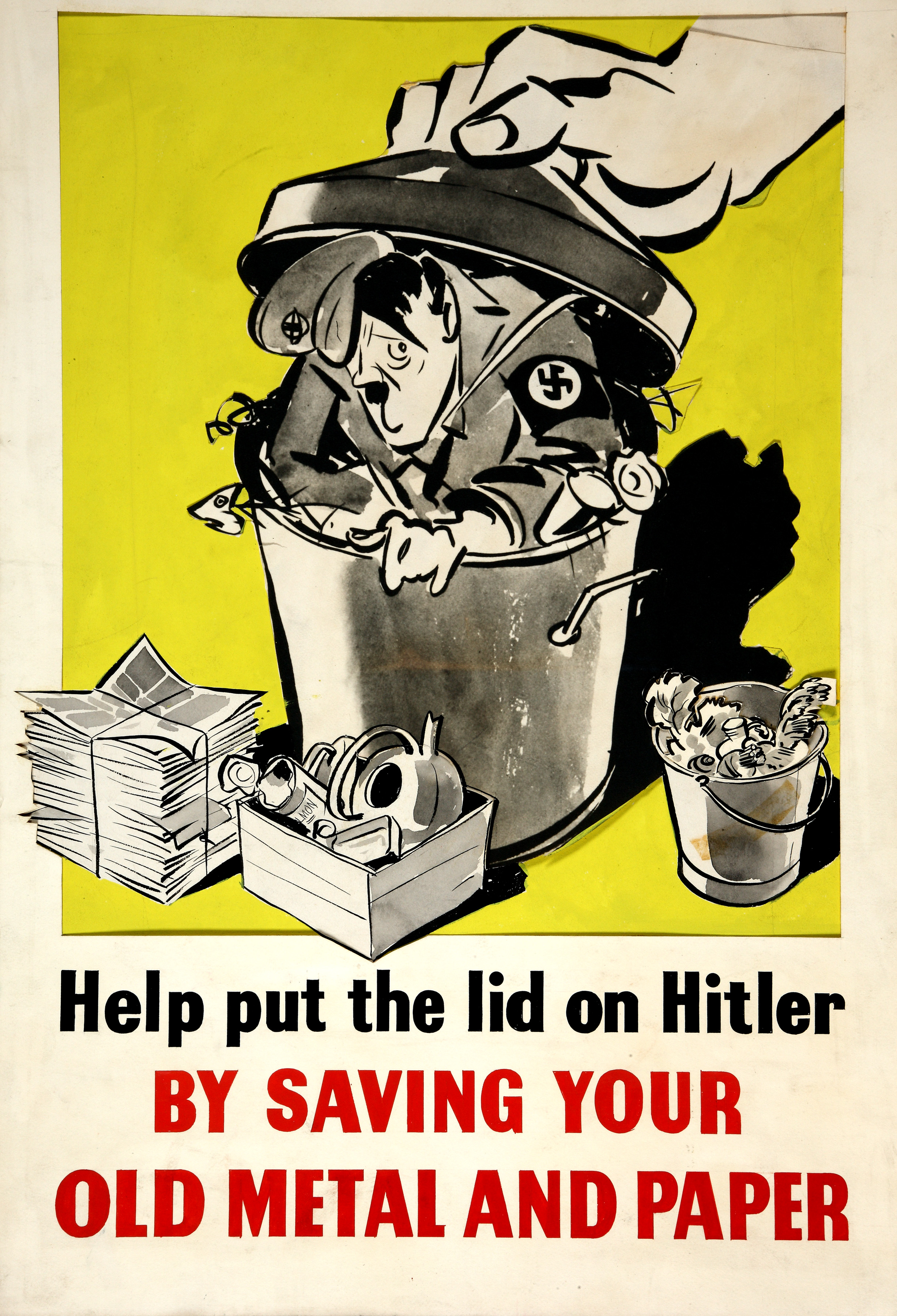
Salvage – Help put the lid on Hitler by saving your old metal and paper

The major powers devoted 50–61 percent of their total GDP to munitions production. The Allies produced about three times as much in munitions as the Axis powers.

Munitions Production in World War II (Expenditures in billions of dollars, US 1944 munitions prices)
Country/Alliance	Year						
Country/Alliance	Average 1935–39	1940	1941	1942	1943	1944	Total 1939–44
(United States) U.S.A.	0.3	1.5	4.5	20.0	38.0	42.0	106.3
(United Kingdom) Britain	0.5	3.5	6.5	9.0	11.0	11.0	41.5
(Soviet Union) U.S.S.R.	1.6	5.0	8.5	11.5	14.0	16.0	56.6
Allies Total	2.4	10.0	20.0	41.5	64.5	70.5	204.4
(Nazi Germany) Germany	2.4	6.0	6.0	8.5	13.5	17.0	53.4
Japan	0.4	1.0	2.0	3.0	4.5	6.0	16.9
Axis Total	2.8	7.0	8.0	11.5	18.0	23.0	70.3

Source: Goldsmith data in Harrison (1988) p. 172

Real Value Consumer Spending
Country	Year							
Country	1937	1939	1940	1941	1942	1943	1944	1945
Japan	100	107	109	111	108	99	93	78
(Nazi Germany) Germany	100	108	117	108	105	95	94	85
(United States) U.S.A.	100	96	103	108	116	115	118	122

Source: Jerome B Cohen, Japan's Economy in War and Reconstruction (1949) p 354

== Allies ==
The Allies called themselves the "United Nations" (even before that organization formed in 1945), and pledged their support to the Atlantic Charter of 1941. The Charter stated the ideal goals of the war: no territorial aggrandizement; no territorial changes made against the wishes of the people; restoration of self-government to those deprived of it; free access to raw materials; reduction of trade restrictions; global cooperation to secure better economic and social conditions for all; freedom from fear and want; freedom of the seas; and abandonment of the use of force, as well as the disarmament of aggressor nations.

=== Belgium ===
The sudden German invasion of neutral Belgium in May 1940 led in a matter of 18 days to the collapse of the Belgian army; King Leopold obtained an armistice that involved direct German military administration. The King refused the government's demand that he flee with them to Britain; he remained as a puppet ruler under German control. The Belgian bureaucracy remained in place and generally cooperated with the German rulers. Two pro-German movements, the Flemish National Union comprising Flemish (Dutch-speaking) separatists and the Walloon (French-speaking) Rexists led by Léon Degrelle (1906–94), supported the invaders and encouraged their young men to volunteer for the German army. Small but active resistance movements, largely Communist, provided intelligence to the Allies. During the Holocaust in Belgium, the Nazis hunted down the 70,000 Jews living in Belgium, most of them refugees, and killed 29,000 of them.

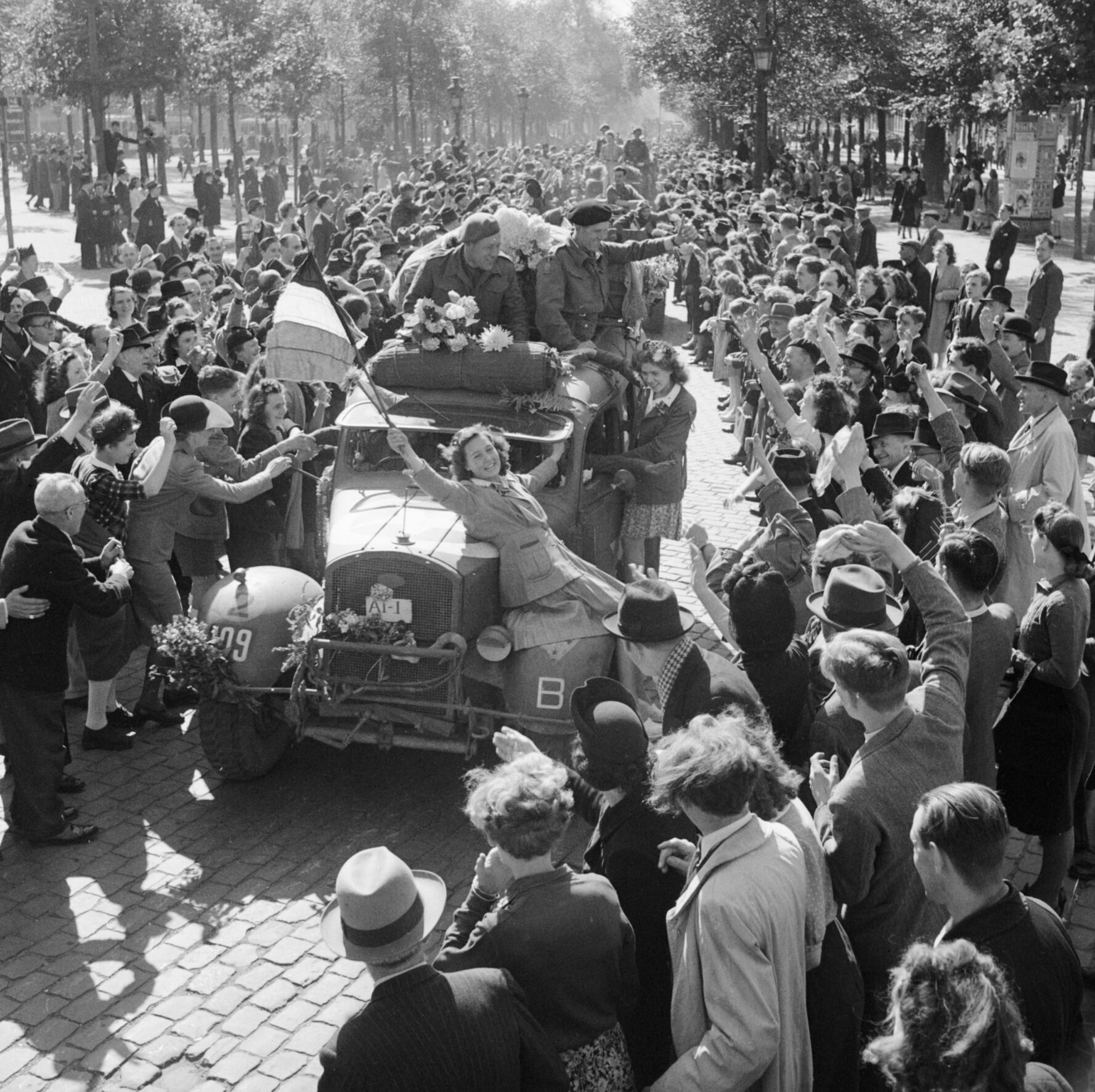
Scenes of jubilation as British troops liberate Brussels, 4 September 1944

The Germans expected to exploit Belgium's industrial resources to support their war machine. Their policies created severe shortages for the Belgian people, but shipped out far less than Germany had expected. They set up the "Armaments Inspection Board" in 1940 to relay munitions orders to factories; the Board came under the control of the German Minister of Armaments, Albert Speer in 1943, and had offices in industrial areas that were supposed to facilitate orders for material, and supervise production. However, factory production fell sharply after 1942. Although collaboration with the Nazis, especially among the Flemish, was evident in 1940, it soon faded in importance. Labor strikes and systematic sabotage slowed production, as did the emigration of workers to rural areas, Allied bombing, food shortages, and worker resentment of forced labor.

The Allies retook all of Belgium in September 1944 as the Germans retreated. They reappeared briefly during the hard fighting of the Battle of the Bulge in December 1944, but were finally expelled in January 1945. The London‐based Belgian government in exile returned, but had to confront the resistance movements that demanded radical political change.

=== China ===
China suffered the second highest number of casualties of the entire war. Civilians in the occupied territories had to endure many large-scale massacres, including that in Nanjing, Jiangsu and Pingdingshan, Liaoning. In a few areas, the Japanese army also unleashed newly developed biological weapons on Chinese civilians, leading to an estimated 200,000 dead. Tens of thousands died when Kuomintang (Nationalist) troops broke the levees of the Yangtze to stop the Japanese advance after the loss of the Chinese capital, Nanjing. Millions more Chinese died because of famine during the war.

At the end of the war Japan was bombed with two atomic bombs and surrendered. Japan had captured major coastal cities like Shanghai early in the war, cutting the rest of China off from its chief sources of finance and industry. Millions of Chinese moved to remote western regions to avoid invasion. Cities like Kunming ballooned with new arrivals. Entire factories and universities were relocated to safe areas so society could still function. Japan replied with hundreds of air raids on the new capital, Chongqing.

Although China received much aid from the United States, China did not have sufficient infrastructure to properly arm or even feed its military forces, let alone its civilians.

China was divided into three zones, with the Nationalists led by Chiang Kai-shek (Chiang or Jiang) the southwest and the Communists led by Mao Zedong (Mao) in control of much of the northwest. Coastal areas were occupied by the Japanese, and civilians were treated harshly; some young men were drafted into the puppet Chinese army.

=== France ===
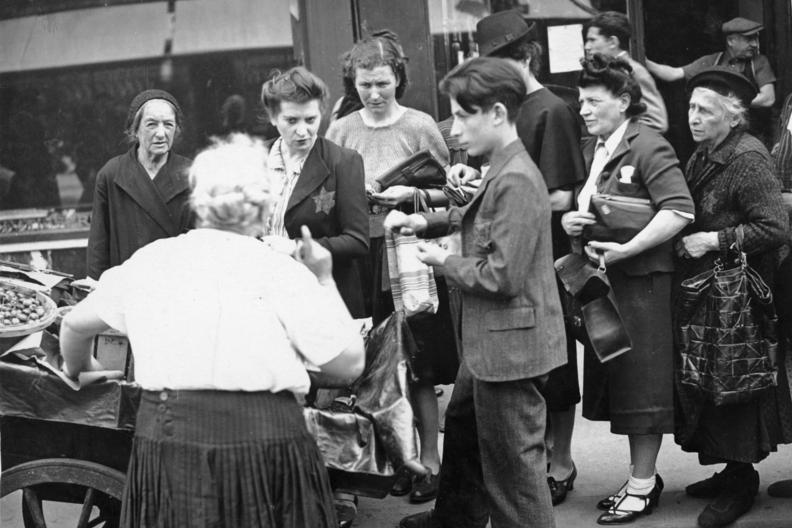
French Jews wearing the compulsory yellow star on their clothing, Paris, 1942

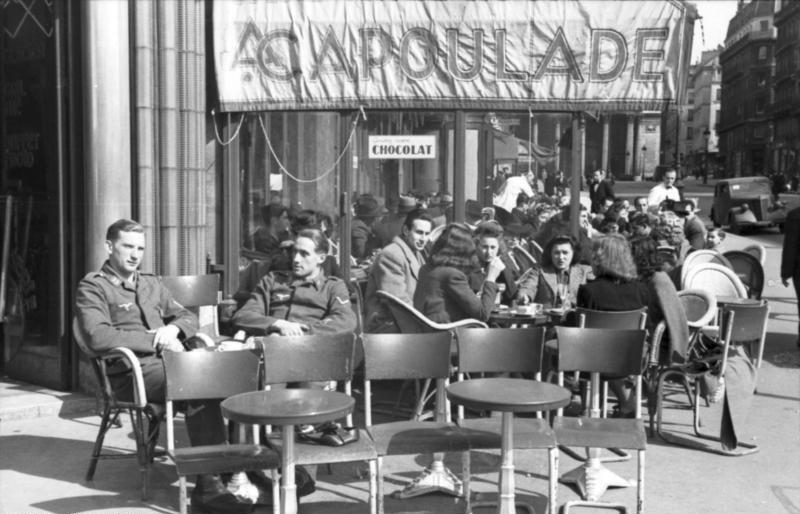
German soldiers at the café Capoulade on Boulevard Saint-Michel, March 1943

After the stunningly quick defeat in June 1940, France was knocked out of the war; part of it, with its capital in Vichy, became an informal ally of the Germans. A powerful Resistance movement sprang up, as the Germans fortified the coast against an Allied invasion and occupied the northern half of the country. The Germans captured 2,000,000 French soldiers, and kept them as prisoners of war in camps inside of Germany for the duration of the war, using them as hostages to guarantee French cooperation. The Vichy French government cooperated closely with the Germans, sending food, machinery and workers to Germany. Several hundred thousand Frenchmen and women were forced to work in German factories, or volunteered to do so, as the French economy itself deteriorated. Nevertheless, there was a strong Resistance movement, with fierce anti-resistance activities carried out by the Nazis and the French police. Most Jews were rounded up by the Vichy police and handed over to the Germans, who sent them to death camps.

==== War wives ====
The two million French soldiers held as POWs and forced laborers in Germany throughout the war were not at risk of death in combat, but the anxieties of separation for their 800,000 wives were high. The government provided a modest allowance, but one in ten became prostitutes to support their families. Meanwhile, the Vichy regime promoted a highly traditional model of female roles. After the war, France gave women the vote and additional legal and political rights, although nothing on the scale of the enfranchisement that followed World War I.

==== Food shortages ====
Women suffered shortages of all varieties of consumer goods and the absence of the men in POW camps. The rationing system was stringent and very badly managed, leading to pronounced malnourishment, black markets and hostility to state management of the food supply. The Germans seized about 20% of the French food production, which caused severe disruption to the household economy of the French people. French farm production fell by half because of the lack of fuel, fertilizer and workers; even so, the Germans seized half the meat and 20% of the produce.

Supply problems quickly affected French stores, which lacked most items. The government responded by rationing, but German officials set the policies and hunger prevailed, especially affecting young people in urban areas. In shops, the queues lengthened. Some people—including German soldiers who could take advantage of arbitrary exchange rates that favored Germany—benefited from the black market, where food was sold without coupons at very high prices. Farmers diverted meat to the black market, so there was much less for the open market. Counterfeit food coupons were also in circulation. Direct buying from farmers in the countryside and barter against cigarettes became common. These activities were strictly forbidden, and carried the risk of confiscation and fines. Food shortages were most acute in the large cities. Vitamin deficiencies and malnutrition were prevalent.

Advice about eating a healthier diet and home growing produce was distributed. Slogans like "Digging for Victory" and "Make Do and Mend" appeared on national posters and became a part of the war effort. The city environment made these efforts nearly negligible. In the more remote country villages, however, clandestine slaughtering, vegetable gardens and the availability of milk products permitted survival. The official ration provided starvation-level diets of 1,300 or fewer calories a day (5400 kJ), supplemented by home gardens and, especially, black market purchases.

=== Netherlands ===
The Dutch famine of 1944, known as the Hongerwinter ("Hunger winter") was a man-made famine imposed by Germany in the occupied western provinces during the winter of 1944–1945. A German blockade cut off food and fuel shipments from farm areas. A total of 4.5 million people were affected, of whom 18,000 died, despite an elaborate system of emergency soup kitchens.

=== Poland ===
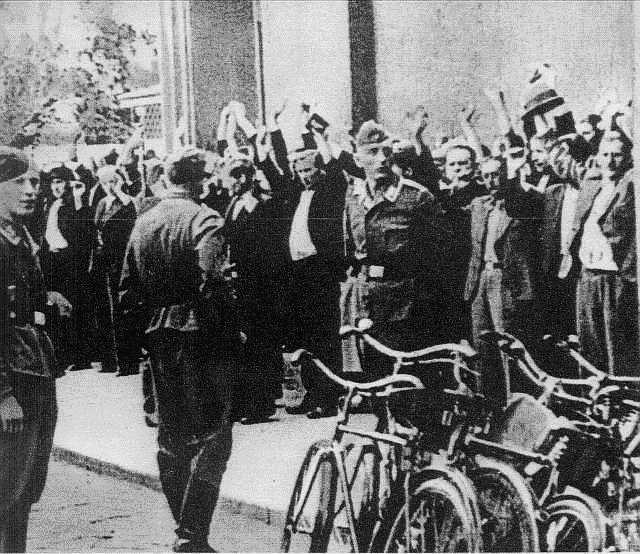
Łapanka – Polish civilian hostages captured by German soldiers on the street, September 1939

==== Food deprivation as a Nazi weapon ====
The Nazi Hunger Plan was to kill the Jews of Poland quickly, and slowly to force the Poles to leave by threat of starvation, so that they could be replaced by German settlers. The Nazis coerced Poles to work in Germany by providing favorable food rations for families who had members working in the Reich. The ethnic German population in Poland (Volksdeutsche) were given good rations and were allowed to shop for food in special stores. The German occupiers created a draconian system of food controls, including severe penalties for the omnipresent black market. There was a sharp increase in mortality due to the general malnutrition, and a decline in birth rates.

By mid 1941, the German minority in Poland received 2,613 calories (11,000 kJ) per day, while Poles received 699 and Jews in the ghetto 184. The Jewish ration fulfilled just 7.5% of their daily needs; Polish rations only 26%. Only the ration allocated to Germans provided the full required calorie intake.

Distribution of food in Nazi occupied Poland as of December 1941

Nationality	Daily Calorie intake
Germans	2,310
Foreigners	1,790
Ukrainians	930
Poles	654
Jews	184(54)

==== Jews in the Warsaw Ghetto: 1943 ====
On 1 September 1939, Germany invaded Poland, conquering it in three weeks, as the Soviets invaded the eastern areas. During the German occupation, there were two distinct civilian uprisings in Warsaw, one in 1943, the other in 1944. The first took place in a zone less than two square miles (5 km^{2}) in area, which the Germans had carved out of the city and called Ghetto Warschau. The Germans built high walls around the Warsaw Ghetto and crowded 550,000 Polish Jews into it, many from the Polish provinces. At first, people were allowed to enter and leave the ghetto, but soon its border became an "iron curtain".

Unless on official business, Jews could not leave, and non-Jews, including Germans, could not enter. Entry points were guarded by German soldiers. Because of extreme conditions and hunger, mortality in the ghetto was high. In 1942, the Germans moved 400,000 ghetto residents to Treblinka where they were gassed on arrival. By 19 April 1943, when the Ghetto Uprising commenced, the population of the ghetto had dwindled to 60,000 individuals. In the following three weeks, virtually all died as the Germans fought and systematically destroyed the buildings in the ghetto.

==== Warsaw Uprising of 1944 ====
As part of Operation Tempest and the single largest insurgent battle of the war, the uprising by Poles began on 1 August 1944. The Polish underground, led by the "Home Army", aware that the Soviet Army had reached the eastern bank of the Vistula, sought to liberate Warsaw much as the French resistance had liberated Paris a few weeks earlier. Joseph Stalin had his own group of Communist leaders for the new Poland and did not want the Home Army or its leaders (based in London) to control Warsaw. So he halted the Soviet offensive and gave the Germans free rein to suppress it. During the ensuing 63 days, 250,000 Poles of the Home Army surrendered to the Germans. After the Germans forced all the surviving population to leave the city, Hitler ordered that any buildings left standing be dynamited—98 percent of the buildings in Warsaw were destroyed.

=== Soviet Union ===
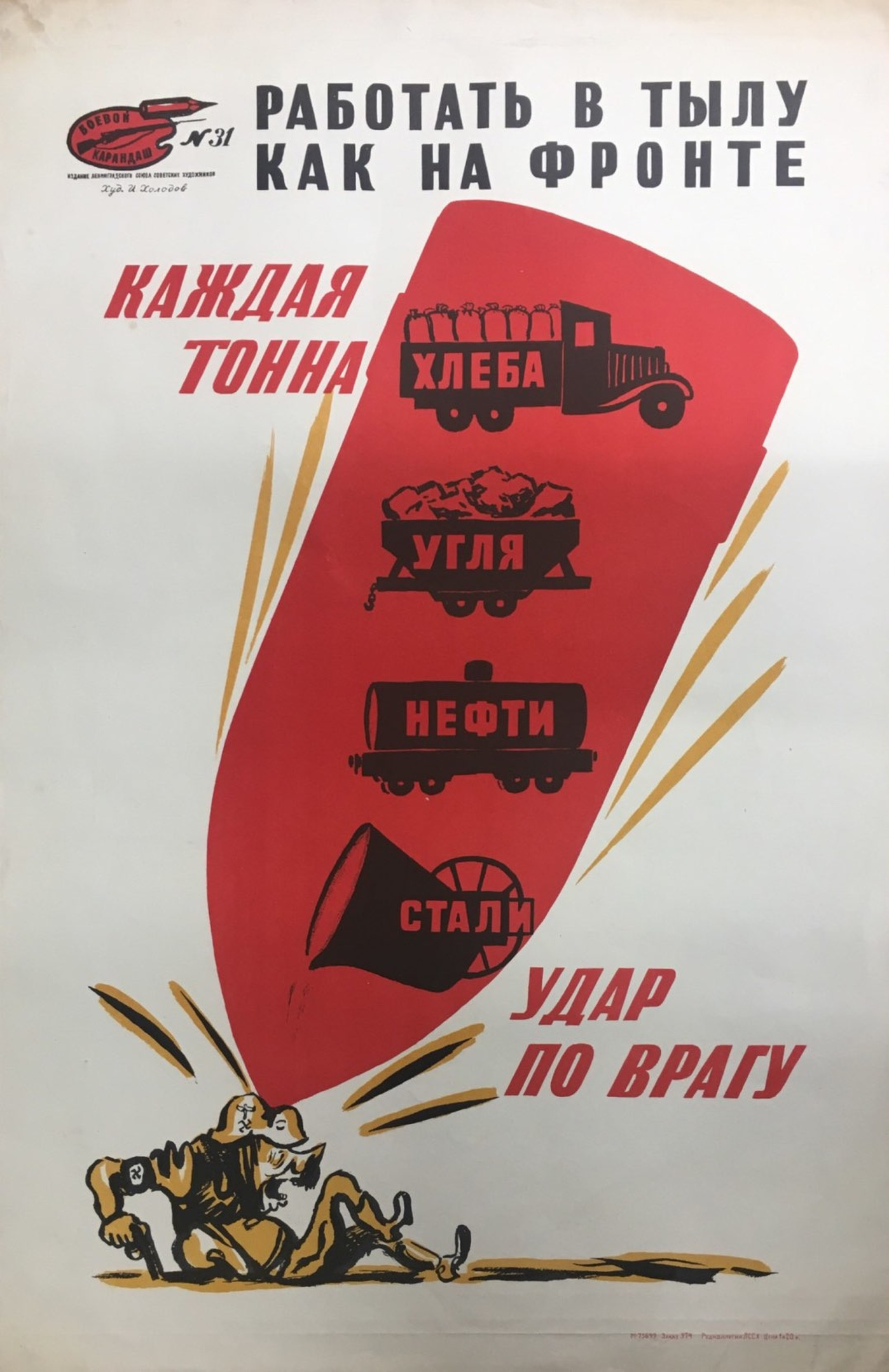
1941 Soviet poster: "Work in the rear as at the front: every ton of bread, coal, oil, steel hits the enemy"

During the invasion of the Soviet Union in the early months of the war, rapid German advances almost captured the cities of Moscow and Leningrad. The bulk of Soviet industry which could not be evacuated was either destroyed or lost due to German occupation. Agricultural production was interrupted, with grain crops left standing in the fields. This caused hunger reminiscent of the early 1930s. In one of the greatest feats of war logistics, factories were evacuated on an enormous scale, with 1,523 factories dismantled and shipped eastwards along four principal routes to the Caucasus, Central Asia, the Ural, and Siberia. In general, the tools, dies and production technology were moved, along with the blueprints and their management, engineering staffs and skilled labor.

The whole of the Soviet Union became dedicated to the war effort. The people of the Soviet Union were probably better prepared than any other nation involved in World War II to endure the material hardships of the war, primarily because they were so used to shortages and economic crisis in the past, especially during wartime (World War I had brought similar restrictions on food). Conditions were nevertheless severe. World War II was especially devastating to citizens of the USSR because it was fought on Soviet territory and caused massive destruction. In Leningrad, under German siege, over a million people died of starvation and disease. Many factory workers were teenagers, women and old people.

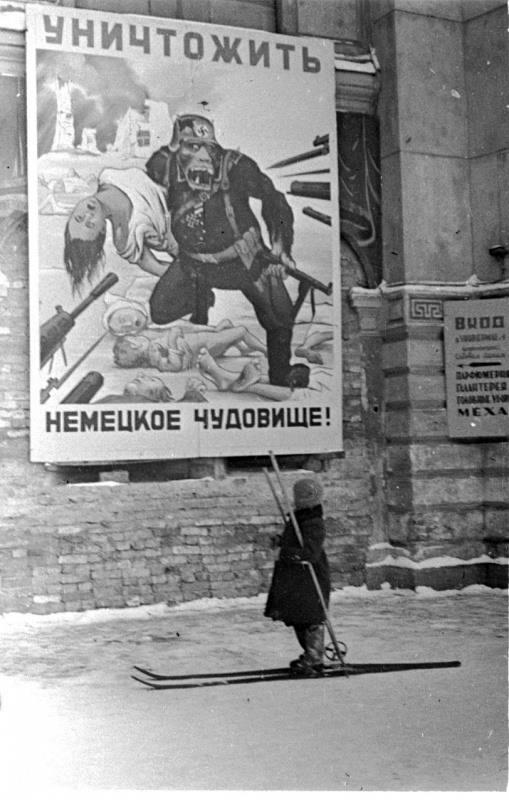
Propaganda in wartime Leningrad: the text reads "Destroy the German monster!"

The government implemented rationing in 1941 and first applied it to bread, flour, cereal, pasta, butter, margarine, vegetable oil, meat, fish, sugar and confectionery all across the country. The rations remained largely stable during the war. Off-ration food was often so expensive that it could not add substantially to a citizen's food supply unless they were especially well-paid. Peasants received no rations and had to make do with any local resources they farmed themselves. Most rural peasants struggled and lived in unbearable poverty, but others sold their surplus food at a high price; a few became rouble millionaires, until a 1947 currency reform wiped out their wealth.

Despite harsh conditions, the war led to a spike in Soviet nationalism and unity. Soviet propaganda toned down extreme Communist rhetoric of the past as the people now rallied to protect their Motherland against the evils of the German invaders. Ethnic minorities thought to be collaborators were forced into exile. Religion, which was previously shunned, became a part of a Communist Party propaganda campaign to mobilize religious people.

Soviet society changed drastically during the war. There was a burst of marriages in June and July 1941 between people about to be separated by the war, and in the next few years the marriage rate dropped off steeply, with the birth rate following shortly thereafter to only about half of what it would have been in peacetime. For this reason mothers with several children during the war received substantial honors and money benefits if they had several children—mothers could earn around 1,300 rubles for having their fourth child and up to 5,000 rubles for their tenth.

==== Survival in Leningrad ====
The city of Leningrad endured more suffering and hardships than any other city in the Soviet Union during World War II. Hunger, malnutrition, disease, starvation, and even cannibalism became common during the siege, which lasted from September 1941 until January 1944. Many people lost weight, and grew weaker and more vulnerable to disease. If malnutrition persisted for long enough, its effects were irreversible. People's feelings of loyalty disappeared if they got hungry enough; they would steal from their closest family members in order to survive.

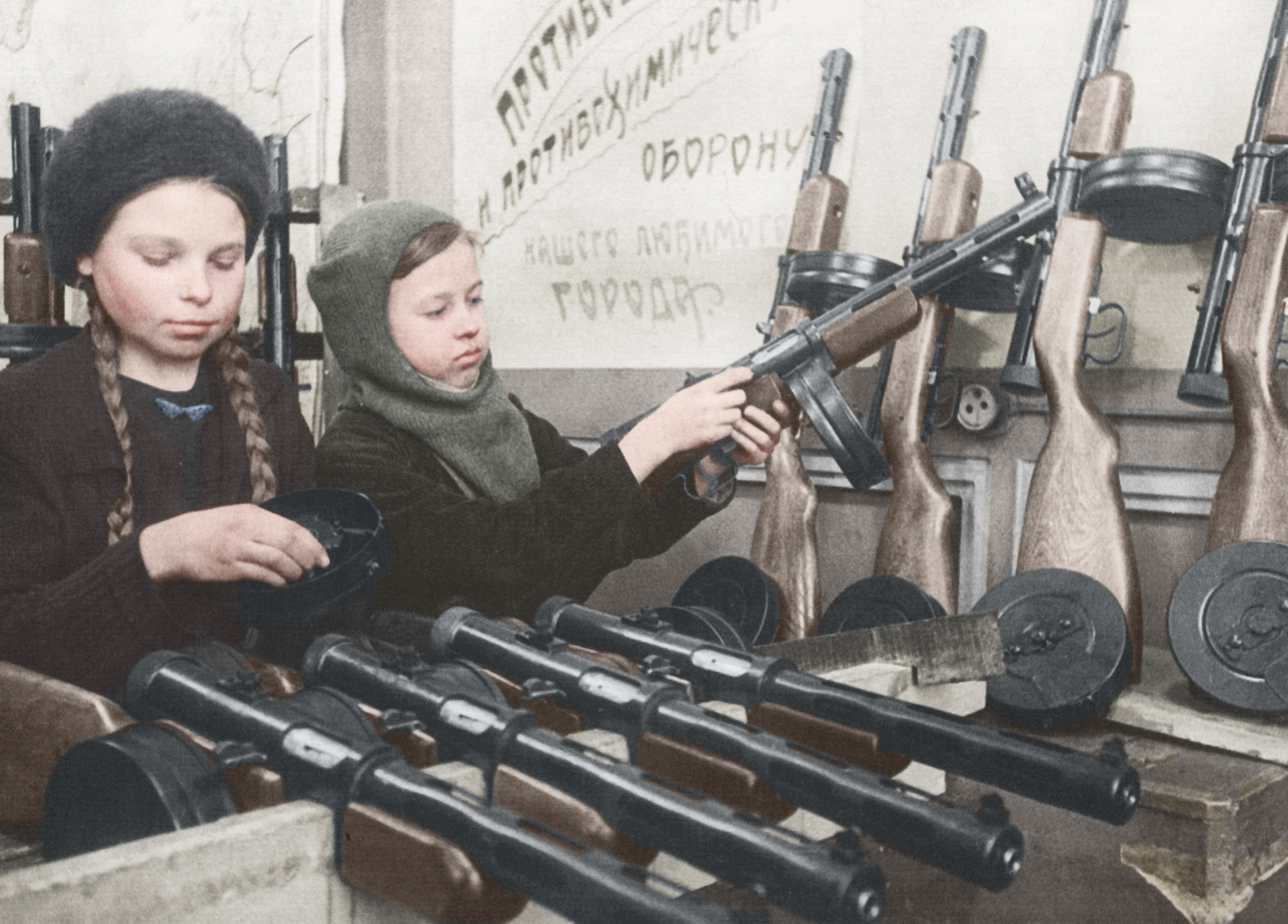
Two girls assemble submachine guns during the siege of Leningrad, 1943.

Only some of the citizens of Leningrad survived. Only 400,000 were evacuated before the siege began; this left 4.5 million in Leningrad, including 700,000 children. Subsequently, more managed to escape; especially when the nearby Lake Ladoga froze over and people could walk over the ice road—or "road of life"—to safety. Those in influential political or social positions used their connections to other elites to leave Leningrad both before and after the siege began. Some factory owners even looted state funds to secure transport out of the city during the first summer of the war. The most risky means of escape, however, was to defect to the enemy and hope to avoid governmental punishment.

Most survival strategies during the siege, though, involved staying within the city and facing the problems through resourcefulness or luck: for instance by securing factory employment, because many factories became autonomous and possessed more of the requirements for survival during the winter, such as food and heat. Workers received larger rations than other civilians, and factories were likely to have electricity if they produced vital goods. Factories also served as mutual support centers, and had clinics and other services like cleaning crews and teams of women who would sew and repair clothes. Factory employees were still driven to desperation on occasion and people resorted to eating glue or horsemeat in factories where food was scarce, but factory employment was the most consistently successful method of survival, and at some food production plants not a single person died.

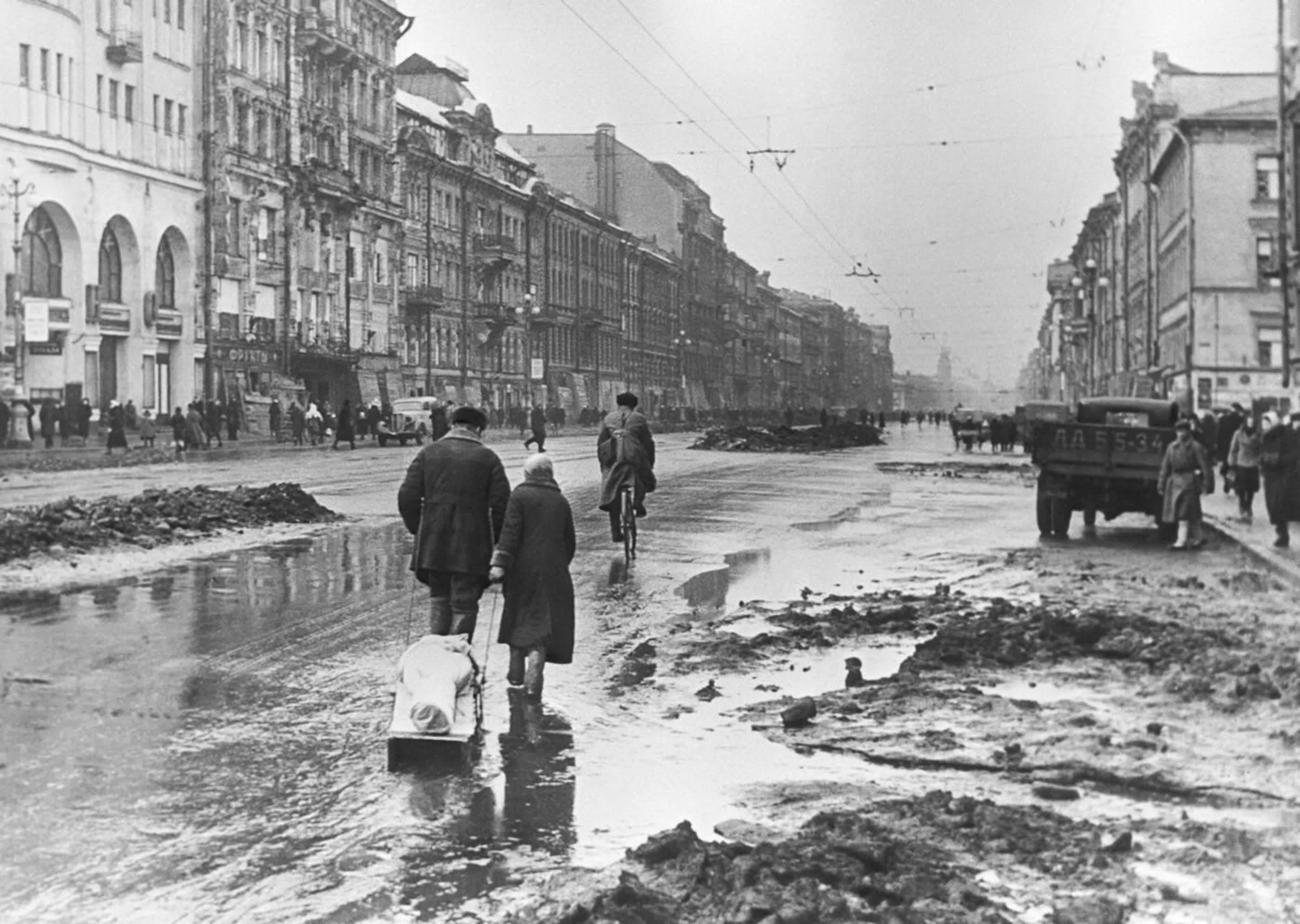
Leningradians on Nevsky Avenue during the siege.

Survival opportunities open to the wider Soviet community included barter and farming on private land. Black markets thrived as private barter and trade became more common, especially between soldiers and civilians. Soldiers, who had more food to spare, were eager to trade with civilians who had extra warm clothes to exchange. Planting vegetable gardens in the spring became popular, primarily because citizens could keep everything grown on their own plots. The campaign also had a potent psychological effect and boosted morale, a survival component almost as crucial as bread.

Many of the most desperate Soviet citizens turned to crime to support themselves. Most common was the theft of food and of ration cards; this could prove fatal for a malnourished person if their card was stolen more than a day or two before a new card was issued. For these reasons, the stealing of food was severely punished and a person could be shot for as little as stealing a loaf of bread. More serious crimes such as murder and cannibalism also occurred, and special police squads were set up to combat these crimes, though by the end of the siege, roughly 1,500 had been arrested for cannibalism.

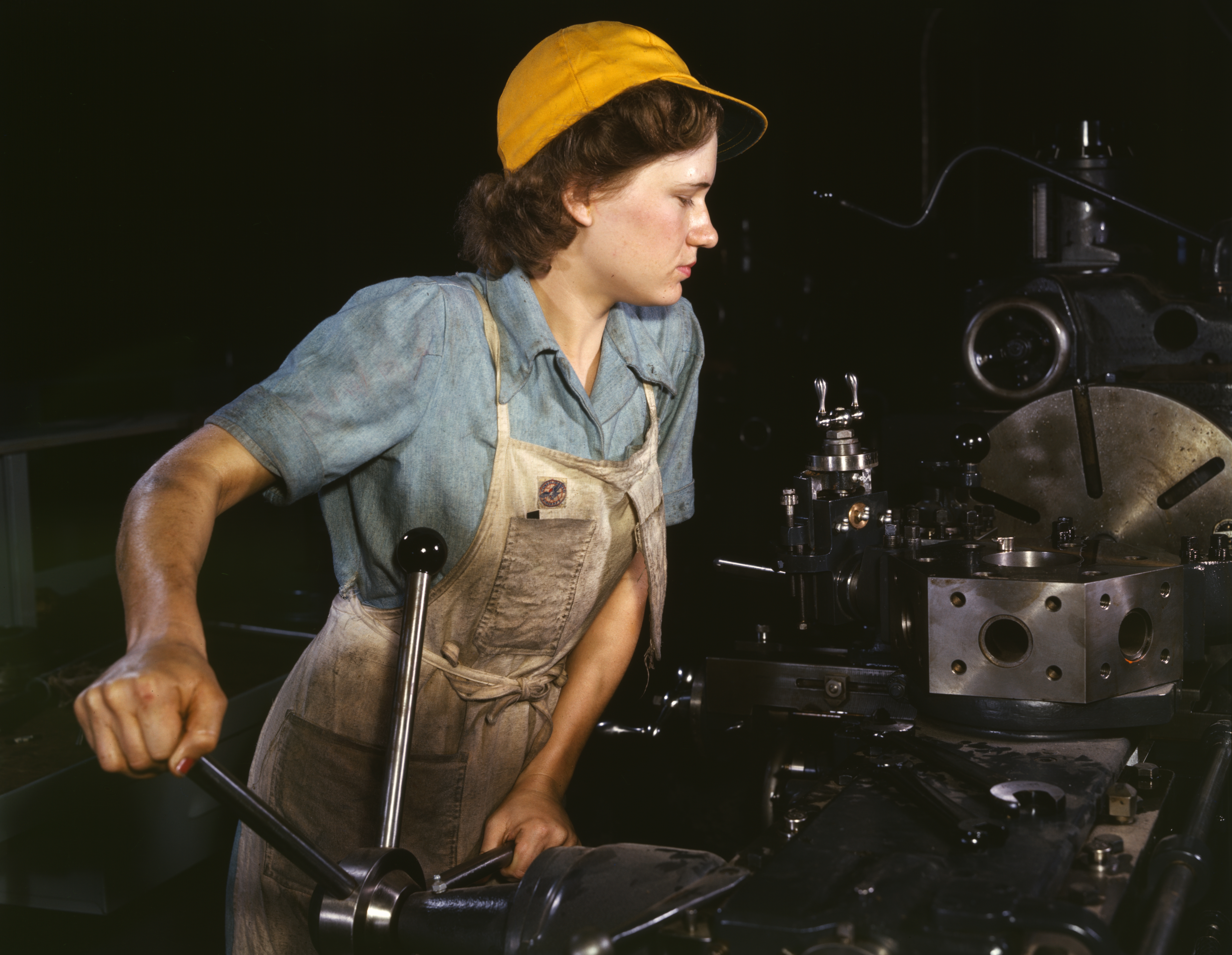
A US Government publicity photo of American machine tool worker in Texas.

=== United States ===
In the United States, farming and other production was increased. For example, citizens were encouraged to plant "victory gardens", personal farms that children sometimes worked on. Sociologist Alecea Standlee (2010) argues that during the war the traditional gender division of labor changed somewhat, as the "home" or domestic female sphere expanded to include the "home front"; meanwhile the public sphere—the male domain—was redefined as the international stage of military action.

==== Women ====
During World War II large numbers of American women entered the industrial labor force and military force, as there was a massive labor shortage following the mass mobilization of American men into military services. Women worked in a variety of industries, including defense factories, shipyards, and aircraft production, in positions that had previously been held by men. By 1943, wartime advertising showing women in occupational and military roles increased, leading away from traditional advertisements promoting a homemaker role. This reflected a change in labor demand and the need for women to fulfill this gap.

In 1942, the establishment of the Women's Army Auxiliary Corps (WAAC), which would later be converted into the Women's Army Corps (WAC) in 1943, allowed women to serve in non-combat military positions including administration, communications, mechanics, and logistics. Along with the WAC women were also serving in organizations such as Women Accepted for Volunteer Emergency Services (WAVES), United States Coast Guard Women's Reserve SPARS, and Women Airforce Service Pilots (WASP). These organizations filled support roles with women and allowed men to be assigned to combat duty overseas. Women were recognized for their patriotic service but were often criticized and subject to public anxiety to changing gender norms.

Wartime media often portrayed female workers as both patriotic labors and traditionally feminine. Advertisements in magazines would depict women in military uniforms or industrial settings while simultaneously promoting cosmetics, fashion, and domestic products. Women were fulfilling both their duty to the war effort without adding to the anxiety of changing gender norms by serving in the labor force and still maintaining their household duties.

Post World War II, many women left their industrial employment as returning servicemen took over the labor force once again. Postwar culture realigned men and women back into their prior traditional roles. However, the opportunities from the labor shortage did raise female labor force participation compared to the prewar participation, causing an important shift in women's employment patterns in the United States. Women's participation in the labor force demonstrated their abilities to perform industrial and administrative labor on a national scale.

==== The Philippines ====
The Philippines was an American possession on the way to independence (scheduled in 1946) and controlled its own internal affairs. The Japanese invaded and quickly conquered the islands in early 1942. The Japanese military authorities immediately began organizing a new government structure in the Philippines and established the Philippine Executive Commission. They initially organized a Council of State, through which they directed civil affairs until October 1943, when they declared the Philippines an independent republic. The Japanese-sponsored Second Philippine Republic headed by President José P. Laurel proved to be ineffective and unpopular as Japan maintained very tight controls.

Japanese occupation of the Philippines was opposed by large-scale underground and guerrilla activity. The Philippine Army, as well as remnants of the U.S. Army Forces Far East continued to fight the Japanese in a guerrilla war. They formed an auxiliary unit of the United States Army. Their effectiveness was such that by the end of the war, Japan controlled only twelve of the forty-eight provinces. One element of resistance in the Central Luzon area was furnished by the Hukbalahap, which armed some 30,000 people and extended their control over much of Luzon. The Allies as well as the combined American and Filipino soldiers invaded in 1944–45; the battle for Manila was contested street by street with large numbers of civilians killed.

As in most occupied countries, crime, looting, corruption, and black markets were endemic. With a view of building up the economic base of the Greater East Asia Co-Prosperity Sphere, the Japanese Army envisioned using the islands as a source of agricultural products needed by its industry. For example, Japan had a surplus of sugar from Taiwan, and a severe shortage of cotton, so they tried to grow cotton on sugar lands with disastrous results. They lacked the seeds, pesticides, and technical skills to grow cotton. Jobless farm workers flocked to the cities, where there was minimal relief and few jobs.

The Japanese Army also tried using cane sugar for fuel, castor beans and copra for oil, derris for quinine, cotton for uniforms, and abaca (hemp) for rope. The plans were very difficult to implement in the face of limited skills, collapsed international markets, bad weather, and transportation shortages. The program was a failure that gave very little help to Japanese industry, and diverted resources needed for food production. As Karnow reports, Filipinos "rapidly learned as well that 'co-prosperity' meant servitude to Japan's economic requirements."

Living conditions were bad throughout the Philippines during the war. Transportation between the islands was difficult because of lack of fuel. Food was in very short supply, with sporadic famines and epidemic diseases.

The Japanese tried to remove all Western and American cultural influences. They met fierce resistance when they tried to undermine the Catholic Church by arresting 500 Christian missionaries. The Filipinos came to feel morally superior to the brutal Japanese and rejected their advances. Newspapers and the media were tightly censored. The Japanese tried to reshape schools and impose the Japanese language. They formed neighborhood associations to inform on the opposition.

=== Commonwealth ===
Conscription was the main means for raising forces in Britain and the dominions. This was a reversal of policy from 1914, when too many men who were vitally needed on the home front volunteered for the military.

=== Australia ===
The government greatly expanded its powers in order to better direct the war effort, and Australia's industrial and human resources were focused on supporting the Australian and American armed forces.

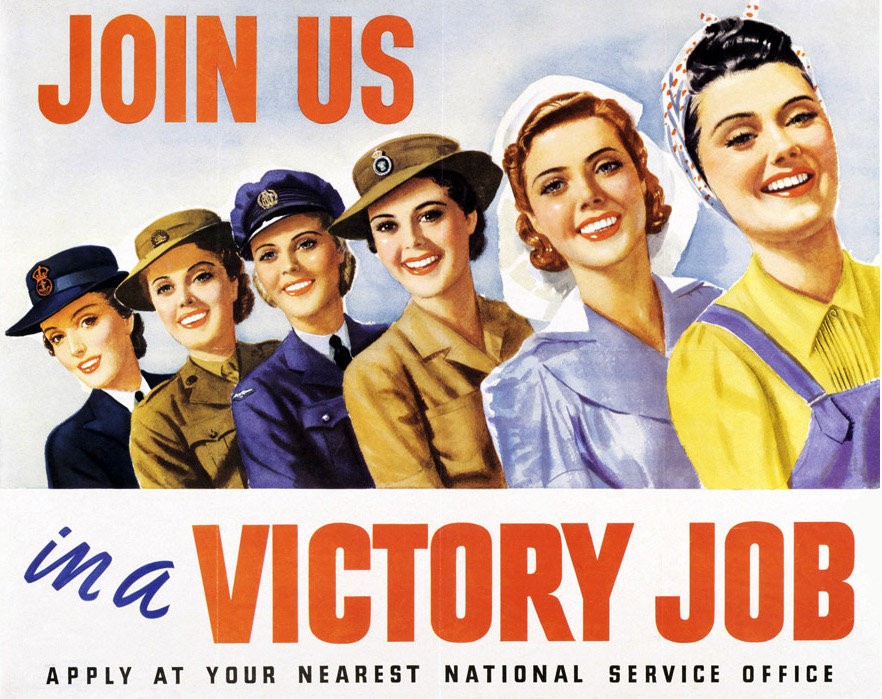
Australian women were encouraged to contribute to the war effort by joining one of the female branches of the armed forces or participating in the labour force.

Australia entered the war in 1939 and sent its forces to fight the Germans in the Middle East (where they were successful) and Singapore (where they were captured by the Japanese in 1942). By 1943, 37% of the Australian GDP was directed at the war effort. Total war expenditure came to £2,949 million between 1939 and 1945.

The Curtin Labor Government took over in October 1941, and energised the war effort, with rationing of scarce fuel, clothing and some food. When Japan entered the war in December 1941, the danger was at hand, and all women and children were evacuated from Darwin and northern Australia. The Commonwealth Government took control of all income taxation in 1942, which gave it extensive new powers and greatly reduced the states' financial autonomy.

Manufacturing grew rapidly, with the assembly of high performance guns and aircraft a specialty. The number of women working in factories rose from 171,000 to 286,000. The arrival of tens of thousands of Americans was greeted with relief, as they could protect Australia where Britain could not. The US sent in $1.1 billion in Lend Lease, and Australia returned about the same total in services, food, rents and supplies to the Americans.

Three major incidents that took place on Australian territory were the Bombing of Darwin, the attack on Sydney Harbour and the Cowra breakout.

=== Britain ===
Britain's total mobilisation during this period proved to be successful in winning the war, by maintaining strong support from public opinion. The war was a "people's war" that enlarged democratic aspirations and produced promises of a postwar welfare state.

==== Munitions ====
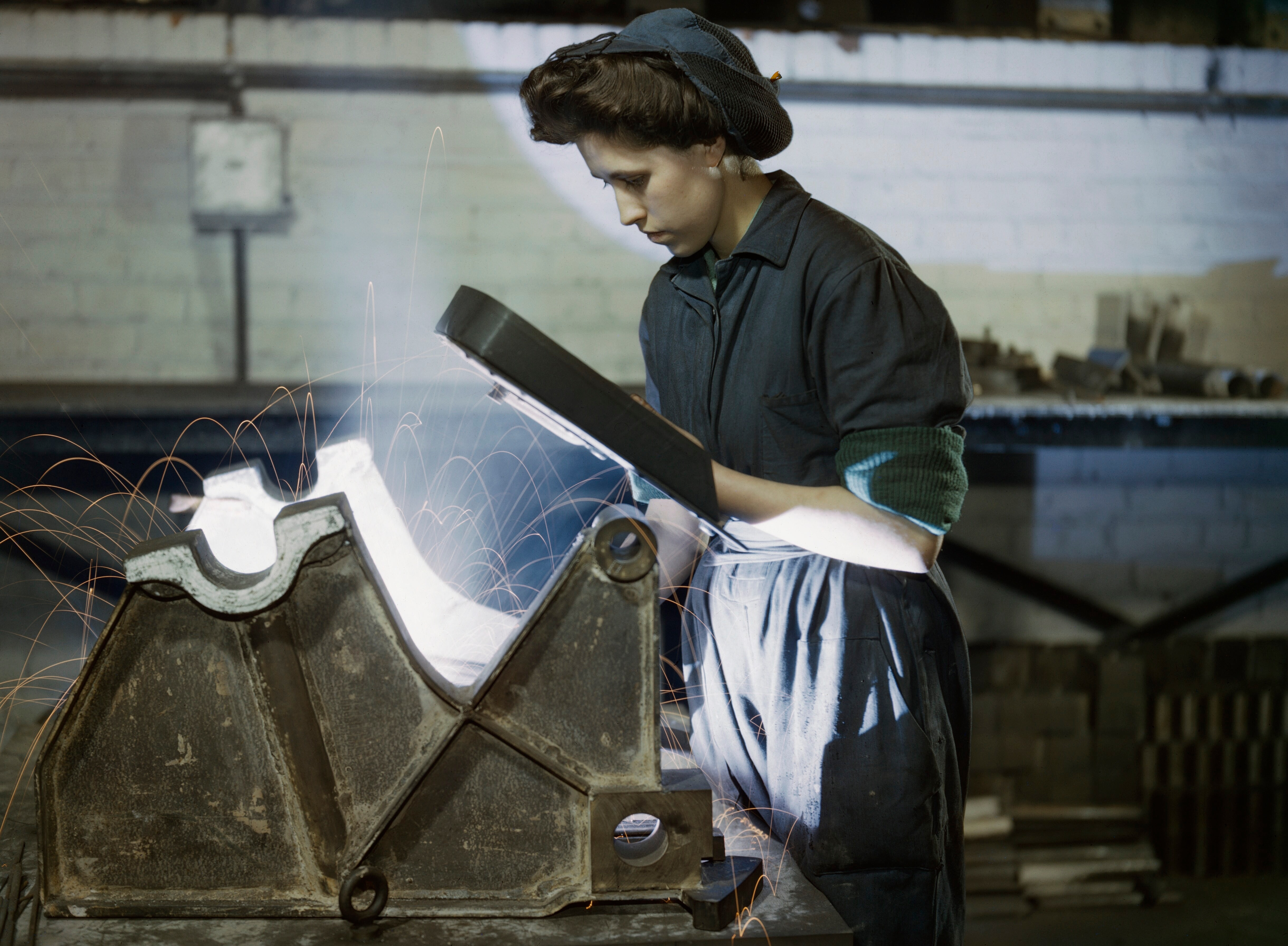
A welder working on the saddle of a Ordnance QF 25-pounder.

In mid-1940, the Royal Air Force (RAF) was called on to fight the Battle of Britain, but suffered serious losses. It lost 458 aircraft in France—more than current production—and was hard pressed. The government decided to concentrate on only five types of aircraft in order to optimise output. They were: Wellingtons, Whitley Vs, Blenheims, Hurricanes and Spitfires. These aircraft received extraordinary priority, which covered the supply of materials and equipment and even made it possible to divert from other types the necessary parts, equipment, materials and manufacturing resources. Labour was moved from other aircraft work to factories engaged on the specified types. Cost was no object. The delivery of new fighters rose from 256 in April to 467 in September—more than enough to cover the losses—and Fighter Command emerged triumphantly from the Battle of Britain in October with more aircraft than it had possessed at the beginning. Starting in 1941, the US provided munitions through Lend-Lease that totalled $15.5 billion

==== Rationing ====
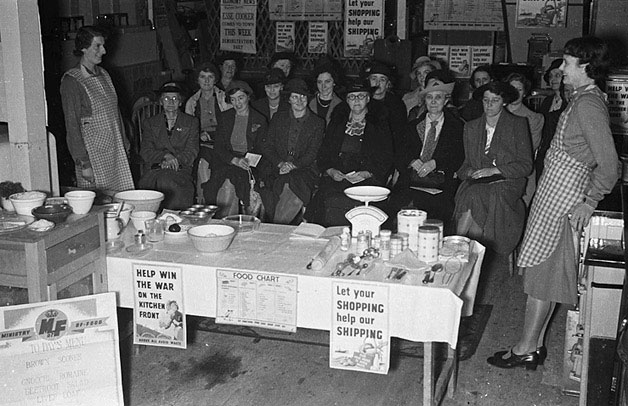
Wartime food and cookery demonstrations, 1940.

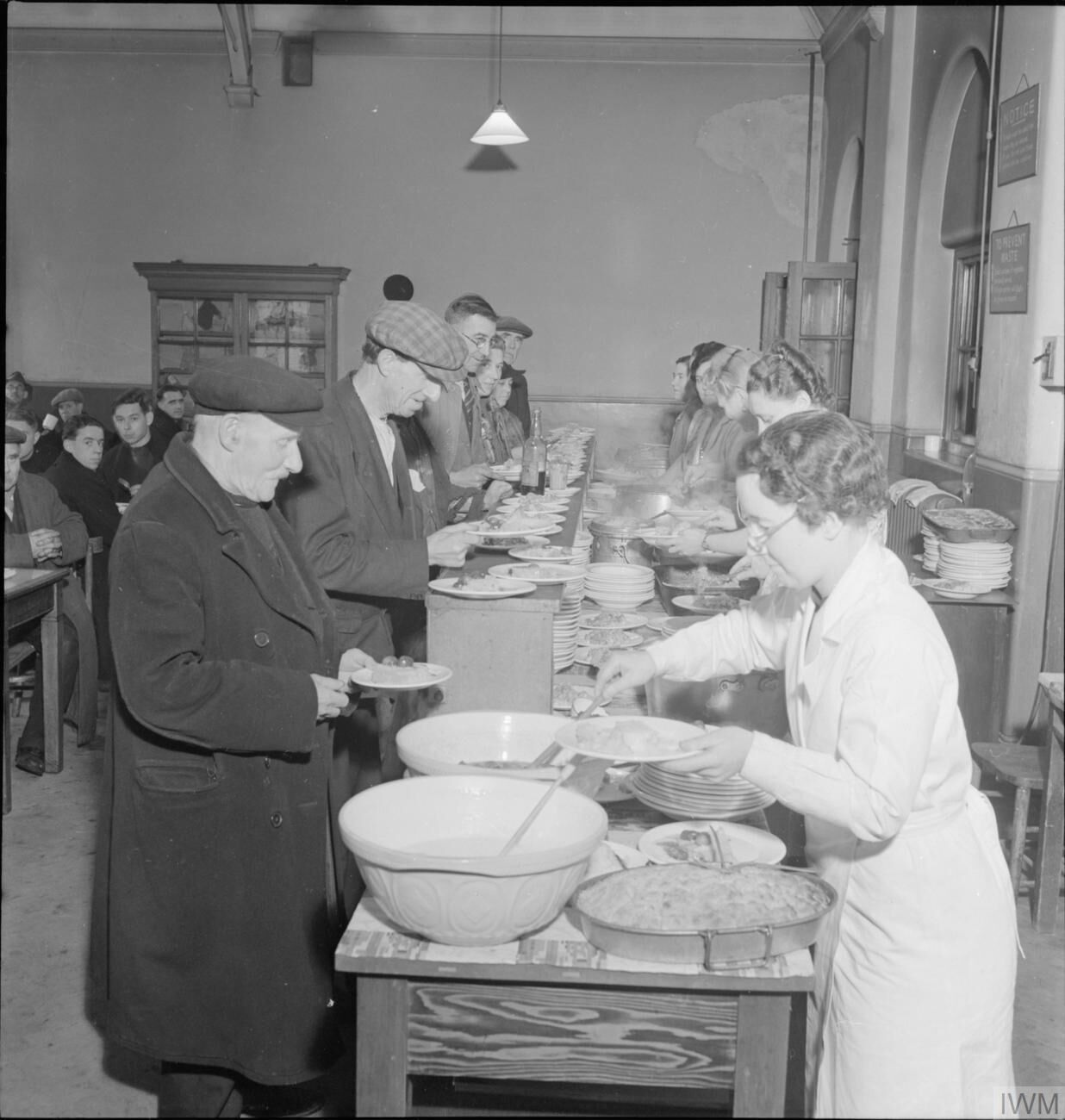
A British Restaurant in London, 1942. 2000 were opened to serve low-cost basic meals.

Food, clothing, petrol, leather and other items were rationed. Perishable items such as fruit were not rationed. Access to luxuries was severely restricted, although there was also a significant black market. Families also grew "victory gardens", and small home vegetable gardens. Many goods were conserved to turn into weapons later, such as fat for nitroglycerin production. People in the countryside were less affected by rationing as they had greater access to locally sourced unrationed products than people in cities, and were more able to grow their own.

The rationing system, which was originally based on a specific basket of goods for each consumer, was much improved by switching to a points system which allowed housewives to make choices based on their own priorities. Food rationing also permitted the upgrading of the quality of the food available, and housewives approved—except for the absence of white bread and the government's imposition of an unpalatable wheat meal "national loaf". Surveys of public opinion showed that most Britons were pleased that rationing brought equality and a guarantee of a decent meal at an affordable cost.

==== Evacuation ====
From very early in the war, it was thought that the major industrial cities of Britain, especially London, would come under Luftwaffe air attack; this did happen in The Blitz. Some children were sent to Canada, the US and Australia, and millions of children and some mothers were evacuated from London and other major cities to safer parts of the country when the war began, under government plans for the evacuation of civilians, but they often filtered back. When the Blitz bombing began on 6 September 1940, they evacuated again. The discovery of the poor health and hygiene of evacuees was a shock to many Britons, and helped prepare the way for the Beveridge Report. Children were evacuated if their parents agreed; but in some cases they had no choice. The children were only allowed to take a few things with them, including a gas mask, books, money, clothes, ration book and some small toys.

==== Welfare state ====
An Emergency Hospital Service was established at the beginning of the war, in the expectation that it would be required to deal with large numbers of casualties.

A common theme called for an expansion of the welfare state as a reward to the people for their wartime sacrifices. This was set out in a famous report by William Beveridge. It recommended that the various forms of assistance that had grown up piecemeal since 1911 be rationalised. Unemployment benefits and sickness benefits were to be universal. There would be new benefits for maternity. The old-age pension system would be revised and expanded, and require that a person retired. A full-scale National Health Service would provide free medical care for everyone. All the major political parties endorsed the principles, and they were largely put into effect when peace returned.

==== Memory ====
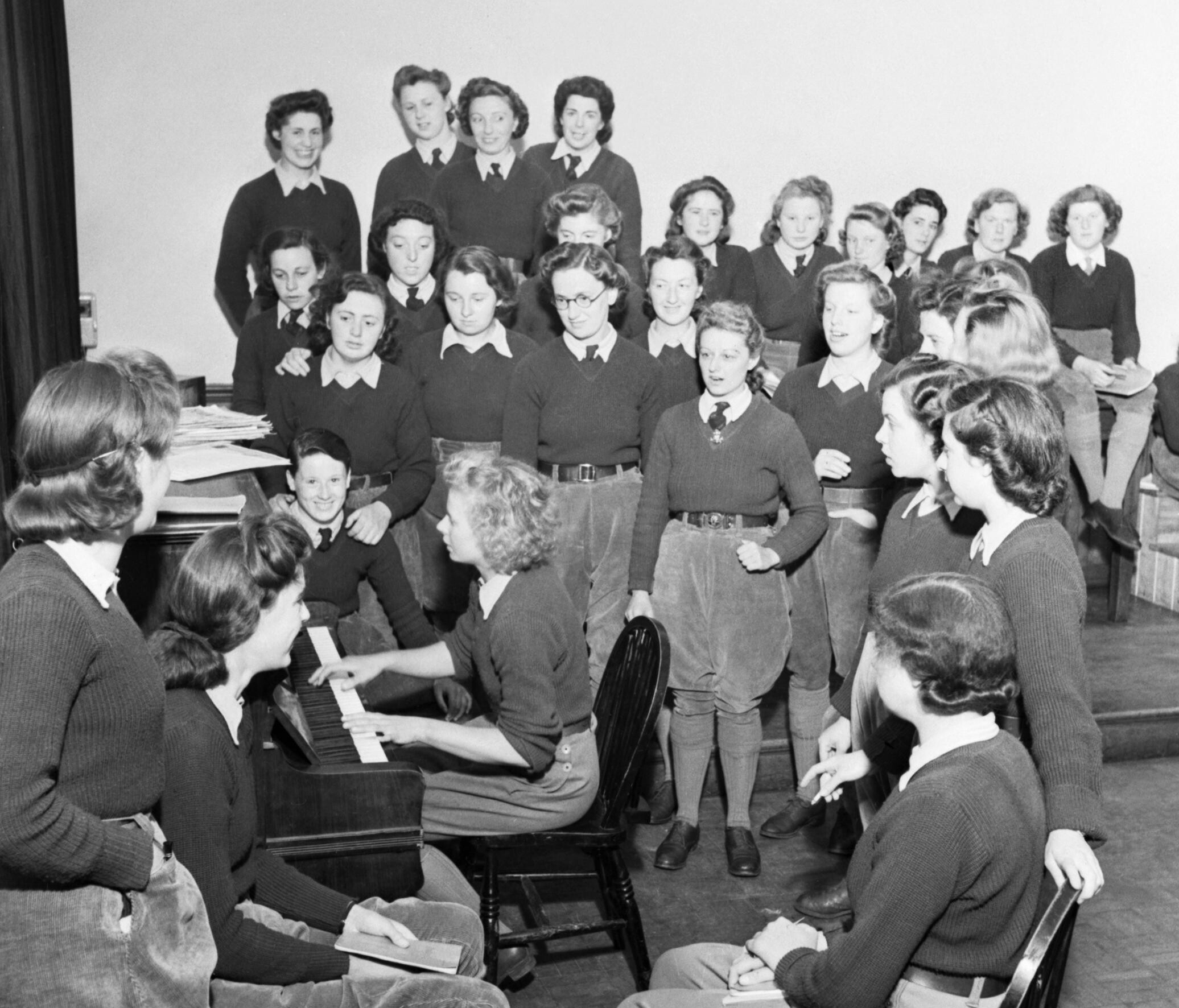
Members of the Women's Land Army in 1942

The themes of equality and sacrifice were dominant during the war, and in the memory of the war. Historian Jose Harris points out that the war was seen at the time and by a generation of writers as a period of outstanding national unity and social solidarity. There was little antiwar sentiment during or after the war. Furthermore, Britain turned more toward the collective welfare state during the war, expanding it in the late 1940s and reaching a broad consensus supporting it across party lines. By the 1970s and 1980s, however, historians were exploring the subtle elements of continuing diversity and conflict in society during the war period. For example, at first historians emphasized that strikes became illegal in July 1940, and no trade union called one during the war. Later historians pointed to the many localised unofficial strikes, especially in coal mining, shipbuilding, the metal trades and engineering, with as many as 3.7 million man days lost in 1944.

The BBC collected 47,000 wartime recollections and 15,000 images in 2003-6 and put them online. The CD audiobook Home Front 1939–45 also contains a selection of period interviews and actuality recordings.

=== Canada ===
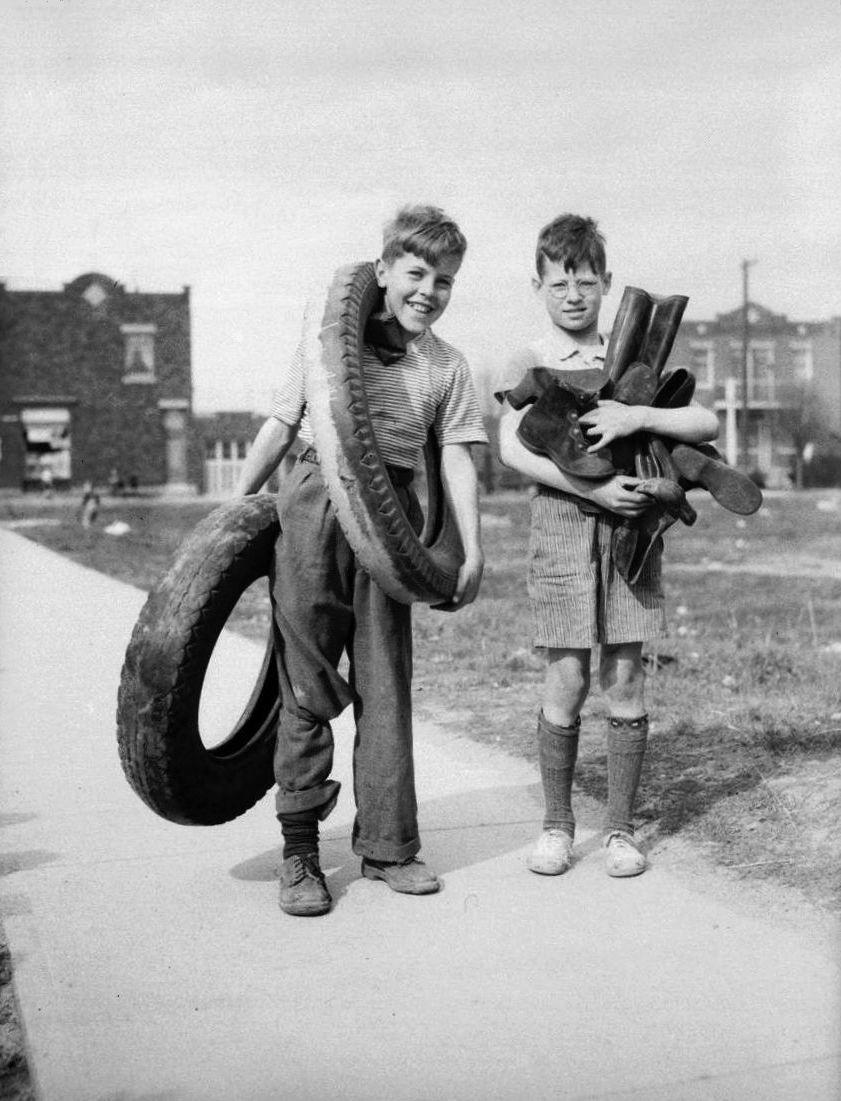
Two boys in Montreal gather rubber for wartime salvage, 1942.

Canada joined the war effort on 10 September 1939; the government deliberately waited after Britain's decision to go to war, partly to demonstrate its independence from Britain and partly to give the country extra time to import arms from the United States as a non-belligerent. War production was ramped up quickly, and was centrally managed through the Department of Munitions and Supply. Unemployment faded away.

Canada became one of the largest trainers of pilots for the Allies through the British Commonwealth Air Training Plan. Many Canadian men joined the war effort, so with them overseas and industries pushing to increase production, women took up positions to aid in the war effort. The hiring of men in many positions in civilian employment was effectively banned later in the war through measures taken under the National Resources Mobilization Act.

Shipyards and repair facilities expanded dramatically as over a thousand warships and cargo vessels were built, along with thousands of auxiliary craft, small boats and others.

Canada expanded food production, but shipped so much to Britain that food rationing had to be imposed. In 1942 it shipped to Britain 25 per cent of total meat production (including 75% of the bacon), 65% of the cheese and 13% of the eggs.

==== Ethnic minorities from enemy countries ====
20% of Canada's population were neither of British nor French origin, and their status was of special concern. The main goal was to integrate the marginalized European ethnicities—in contrast to the First World War policy of internment camps for Ukrainians and Germans. In the case of Germany, Italy and especially Japan, the government watched minorities closely for signs of loyalty to their homelands. The fears proved groundless. In February 1942 21,000 Japanese Canadians were rounded up and sent to internment camps that closely resembled similar camps in the US, because the two governments had agreed in 1941 to coordinate their evacuation policies. Most had lived in British Columbia, but in 1945 they were released from detention and allowed to move anywhere in Canada except British Columbia, or they could go to Japan. Most went to the Toronto area.

==== Women ====
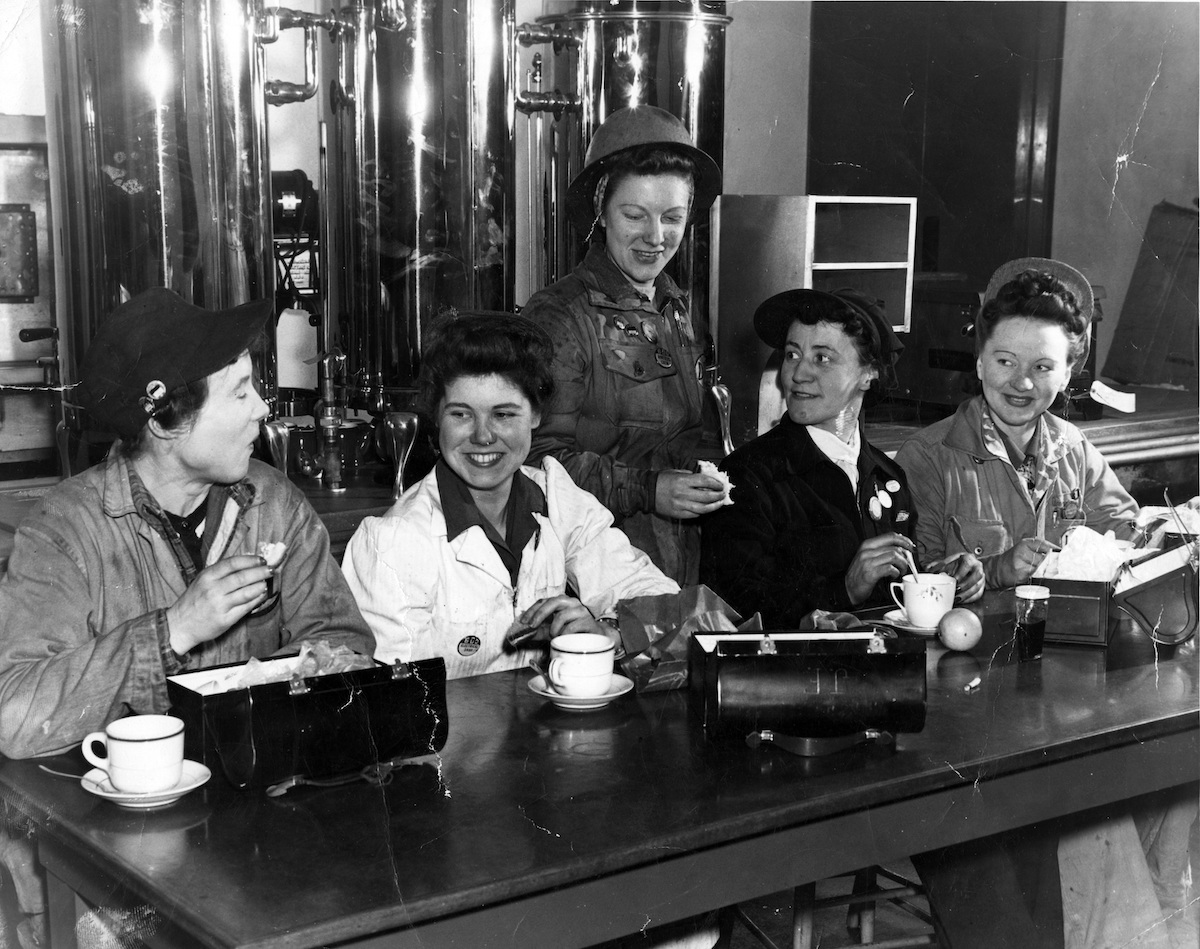
Shop stewards in the canteen of the Burrard Dry Dock in North Vancouver, British Columbia, Canada. Commencing in 1942, Burrard Dry Dock hired over 1000 women, all of whom were dismissed at the end of the war to make way for returning men.

Canadian women responded to urgent appeals to make do, recycle and salvage in order to come up with needed supplies. They saved fats and grease; gathered recycled goods; handed out information on the best ways to get the most out of recycled goods; and organized many other events to decrease the amount of waste. Volunteer organizations led by women also prepared packages for the military overseas and for prisoners of war in Axis countries.

With World War II came a dire need for employees in the workplace. Without women to step in, the economy would have collapsed. By autumn 1944 there were twice as many women working full-time in Canada's paid labour force as in 1939: between 1.0 and 1.2 million; and this did not include part-time workers or women working on farms." Women had to take on this intensive labour and still find time to make jam, clothes, and undertake other acts of volunteering to aid the men overseas.

=== Hong Kong ===
Hong Kong was a British colony captured by Japan on 25 December 1941, after 18 days of fierce fighting. The conquest was swift, but was followed by days of large-scale looting; over ten thousand Chinese women were raped or gang-raped by the Japanese soldiers. The population halved, from 1.6 million in 1941 to 750,000 at war's end because of fleeing refugees; they returned in 1945.

The Japanese imprisoned the ruling British colonial elite and sought to win over the local merchant gentry by appointments to advisory councils and neighbourhood watch groups. The policy worked well for Japan and produced extensive collaboration from both the elite and the middle class, with far less terror than in other Chinese cities. Hong Kong was transformed into a Japanese colony, with Japanese businesses replacing the British. The Japanese Empire had severe logistical difficulties and by 1943 the food supply for Hong Kong was problematic.

The overlords became more brutal and corrupt, and the Chinese gentry became disenchanted. With the surrender of Japan the transition back to British rule was smooth, for on the mainland the Nationalist and Communists forces were preparing for a civil war and ignored Hong Kong. In the long run the occupation strengthened the pre-war social and economic order among the Chinese business community by eliminating some conflicts of interests and reducing the prestige and power of the British.

=== India ===
During World War II, India was a colony of Britain known as British Raj. Britain declared war on behalf of India without consulting with Indian leaders. This resulted in resignation of Congress Ministries.

The British recruited some 2.5 million Indians, who played major roles as soldiers in the Middle East, North Africa and Burma in the British Indian Army. India became the main base for British operations against Japan, and for American efforts to support China.

In Bengal, with an elected Muslim local government under British supervision, the cutoff of rice imports from Burma led to severe food shortages, made worse by maladministration. Prices soared and millions starved because they could not buy food. In the Bengal famine of 1943, three million people died.

An anti-British force of about 40,000 men (and a few women), the Indian National Army (INA) under Subhas Chandra Bose, formed in Southeast Asia. It was under Japanese army control and performed poorly in combat. Its members were captured Indian soldiers from the British Indian Army who gained release from extreme conditions in POW camps by joining the Japanese-sponsored INA. It participated in Battle Of Kohima and Battle of Imphal. In postwar Indian politics, some Indians called them heroes..

The Congress Party in 1942 demanded immediate independence, which Britain rejected. Congress then demanded the British immediately "Quit India" in August 1942, but the Raj responded by immediately jailing tens of thousands of national, state and regional leaders; knocking Congress out of the war. Meanwhile, the Muslim League supported the war effort and gained membership and favors with colonial rulers, as well as British support for its demands for a separate Muslim state (which became Pakistan in 1947).

=== New Zealand ===
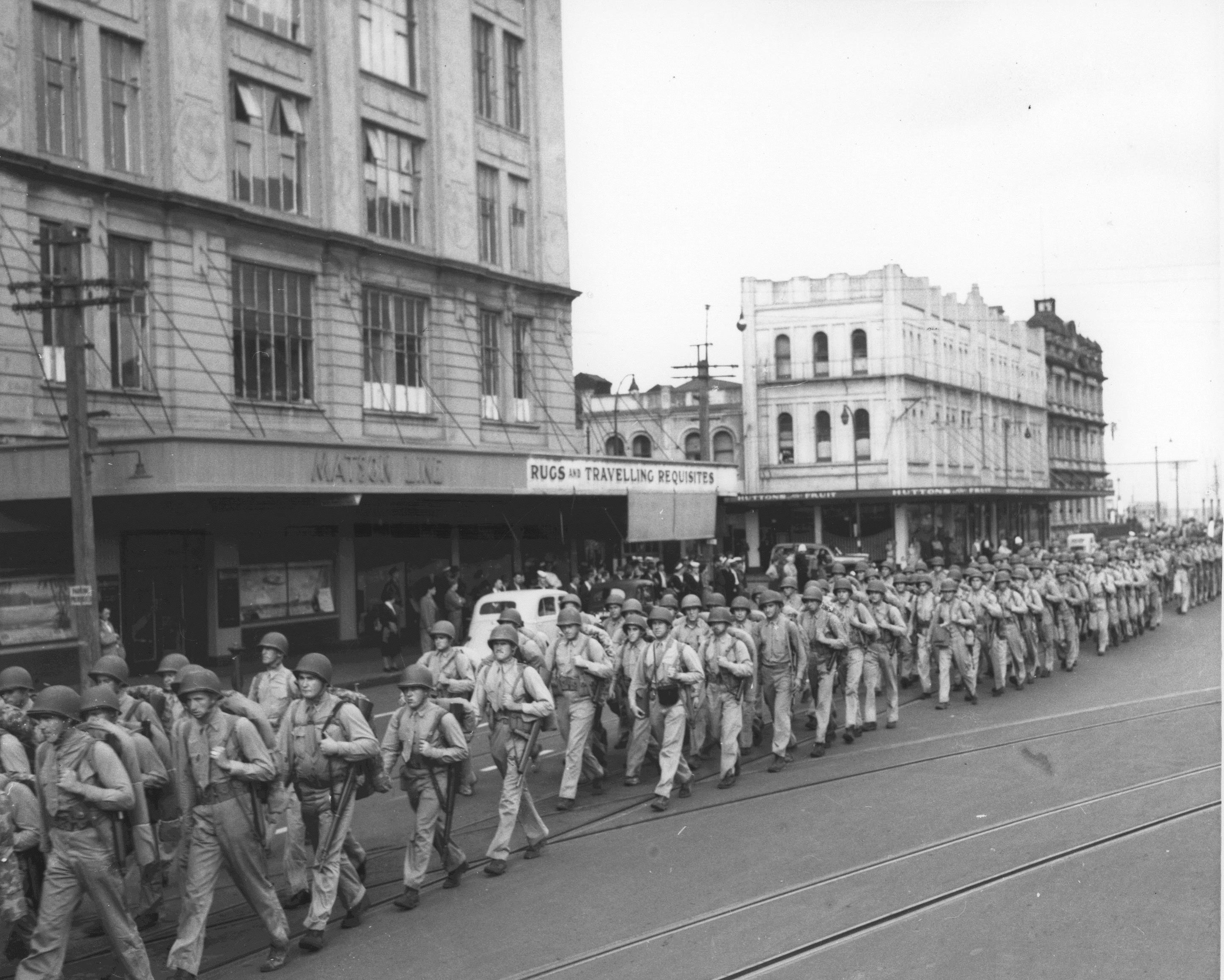
U.S. troops in Auckland in 1943

New Zealand, with a population of 1.7 million, including 99,000 Maori, was highly mobilised during the war. The Labour party was in power and promoted unionisation and the welfare state. The armed forces peaked at 157,000 in September 1942; 135,000 served abroad, and 10,100 died. Agriculture expanded, sending record supplies of meat, butter and wool to Britain. When American forces arrived, they were fed as well. The nation spent £574 million on the war, of which 43% came from taxes, 41% from loans and 16% from American Lend Lease. It was an era of prosperity as the national income soared from £158 million in 1937 to £292 million in 1944. Rationing and price controls kept inflation to only 14% during 1939–45.

Montgomerie shows that the war dramatically increased the roles of women, especially married women, in the labour force. Most of them took traditional female jobs. Some replaced men but the changes here were temporary and reversed in 1945. After the war, women left traditional male occupations and many women gave up paid employment to return home. There was no radical change in gender roles but the war intensified occupational trends under way since the 1920s.

=== Mexico ===
When the Attack on Pearl Harbor happened on 7 December 1941, Mexico severed diplomatic relations with Axis nations but remained neutral and anti-Axis sentiments grew as many Mexicans felt the Attack on Pearl Harbor was an act of unprovoked aggression. However, a security zone was designated alongside the sparsely populated areas of the Baja California in anticipation of a possible Japanese attack. 9,000 Japanese nationals would be forced to relocated to either Mexico City or Guadalajara.

When Nazi U-boats began targeting Mexican oil tankers in the Gulf of Mexico in May 1942, the government and population felt increasingly negative towards the Axis which led to an official declaration of war on Germany. Another response was with the Mexican government taking a more proactive role in subduing Axis propaganda and implement an official propaganda network in the country. From May to August 1942 the country felt the most enthusiastic for the war. Enthusiasm for the war began to wain in August as a result of many agriculturalists and factory owners converting their operations for wartime production to meet trade agreements made with the United States which led to the amount of domestic goods decreasing. Inflation would soon begin with many finding their paychecks did not go as far. As the war went further on the presidential administration of Manuel Ávila Camacho began to feel pressure about handling inflation, shortages of food and other shortages.

Military conscription was practiced in Mexico during the war starting in November 1942 with all men between 18 and 45 being expected to serve in the military. As part of an agreement with the United States, Mexican citizens living in the United States could be drafted into their military and their military could also recruit in Mexico. 250,000 Mexicans served in the United States military during World War 2.

Starting in June 1944 the traditional afternoon siesta was suspended.

=== South Africa ===
Upon entering the Second World War, South Africa was a divided country in terms of attitudes toward the war. Afrikaners were against the war, while non-Afrikaners supported it and the native African population felt ambivalent about it. During the 1930s South Africa was subjected to a Nazi propaganda campaigns targeted toward the Afrikaner population encouraging anti-British and anti-Jewish sentiment. A policy on internment was practiced toward enemy nationals with 6,636 civilians being interned; most of whom were Italian or German. Women were not interned however. South Africa's internment of German nations was the second largest of any Allied power with the United States interning more. South Africa had an all-volunteer policy for serving in the military to ease ethnic tensions.

Rationing was not practiced in South Africa during World War 2. During the war South Africa's biggest industry was still mining but manufacturing did grow with the war. Also during the war the rate of participation in the workforce of white women and Native men grew by 60%. To pay for the war, taxes and loans were issued with the war costing the country £600 million. When it ended the country had to deal with supply shortages and after the war the ruling United Party led by Jan Smuts lost much popular support.

== Axis ==
=== Germany ===
Propaganda poster aimed at the German home front: "Work for victory as hard as we fight for it!"

Germany had not fully mobilized in 1939, not even in 1941, as society continued in prewar channels. Not until 1943, under Albert Speer (the minister of armaments in the Reich), did Germany finally redirect its entire economy and manpower to war production. Instead of using all available Germans, it brought in millions of slave workers from conquered countries, treating them badly (and getting low productivity in return). Germany's economy was simply too small for a longer all-out war. Hitler's strategy was to change this by a series of surprise blitzkriegs. This failed with defeats in Russia in 1941 and 1942, and against the economic power of the allies.

==== Forced labour ====
Instead of expanding the economies of the occupied nations, the Nazis seized the portable machinery and rail cars, requisitioned most of their industrial output, took large quantities of food (15% of French output), and forced the victims to pay for their military occupation.

The Nazis forced 15 million people to work in Germany (including POWs); many died from bad living conditions, mistreatment, malnutrition, and executions. At its peak, forced laborers comprised 20% of the German work force and were a vital part of the German economic exploitation of the conquered territories. They were especially concentrated in munitions and agriculture. For example, 1.5 million French soldiers were kept in POW camps in Germany as hostages and forced workers, and in 1943, 600,000 French civilians were forced to move to Germany to work in war plants.

==== Economy ====
Although Germany had almost double the population of Britain (80 million versus 46 million), it had to use far more labor to provide food and energy. The blockade of Germany deprived Germany of its peacetime supplies of food and minerals from abroad. Britain was able to continue importing food, and employed only a million people (5% of the labour force) on farms, while Germany used 11 million (27%). For Germany to build its twelve synthetic oil plants with a capacity of 3.3 million tons a year it required 2.3 million tons of structural steel and 7.5 million man-days of labor. (Britain imported its oil from Iraq, Persia and North America). To overcome this problem, Germany employed millions of forced laborers and POWs; by 1944, they had brought in more than five million civilian workers and nearly two million prisoners of war—a total of 7.13 million foreign workers.

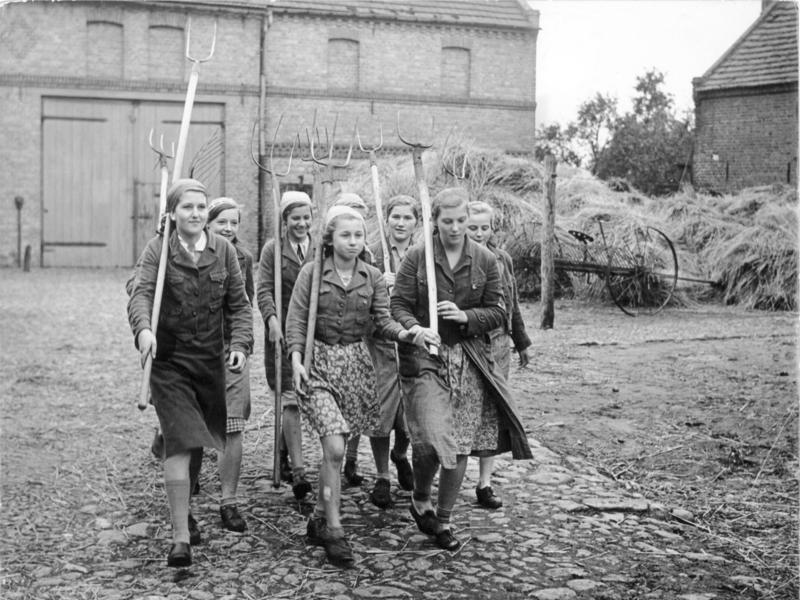
A propaganda photo of teenage girls in the League of German Girls, the female version of the Hitler Youth. Membership was compulsory for all young women. These girls are performing agricultural work in the Province of Brandenburg in 1939.

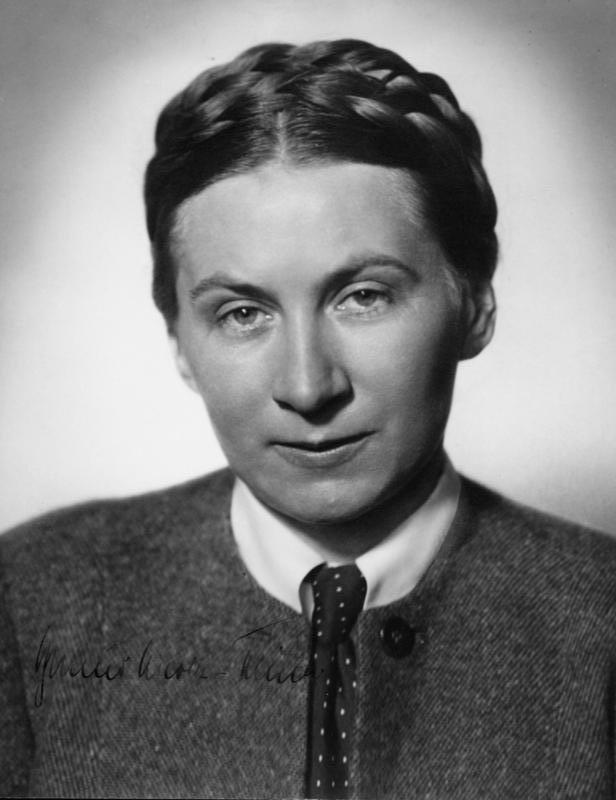
Gertrud Scholtz-Klink, head of the women's wing of the Nazi Party as well as the Woman's Bureau in the German Labor Front

==== Rationing ====
Rationing in Germany was introduced in 1939 immediately upon the outbreak of hostilities. Hitler was at first convinced that it would affect public support for the war if a strict rationing program was introduced. The Nazis were popular partly because Germany was relatively prosperous, and Hitler did not want to lose popularity or public support. Hitler felt that food and other shortages had been a major factor in destroying civilian morale during World War I, leading to defeatism and surrender.

Despite the rationing, civilians had enough food and clothing; witness Howard K. Smith later wrote that "[f]or a people engaged in a life-and-death war ... the German people for two years of war ate amazingly well." The meat ration, for example, was 500 g per week per person. After the German invasion of the Soviet Union in June 1941, however, this changed to 400 g per week, then fell further. Estimating that the meat ration had dropped by up to 80% in five months of fighting in Russia, and citing many other sudden changes in living conditions, Smith wrote that by the time he left Germany in late 1941, "for the first time ... the German people are undernourished". The system gave extra rations for men involved in heavy industry, and extremely low starvation rations for Jews and Poles in the areas occupied by Germany, but not to the Poles inside Germany, many of whom had been brought in to perform heavy labor in German war industries.

According to a 1997 post by Walter Felscher to the "Memories of the 1940s" electronic mailing list:

For every person, there were rationing cards for general foodstuffs, meats, fats (such as butter, margarine and oil) and tobacco products distributed every other month. The cards were printed on strong paper, containing numerous small "Marken" subdivisions printed with their value—for example, from "5 g Butter" to "100 g Butter". Every acquisition of rationed goods required an appropriate "Marken", and if a person wished to eat a certain soup at a restaurant, the waiter would take out a pair of scissors and cut off the required items to make the soup and amounts listed on the menu. In the evenings, restaurant-owners would spend an hour at least gluing the collected "Marken" onto large sheets of paper which they then had to hand in to the appropriate authorities.

The rations were enough to live from, but clearly did not permit luxuries. Whipped cream was unknown from 1939 until 1948, as well as chocolates, cakes with rich creams etc. Meat could not be eaten every day. Other items were not rationed, but simply became unavailable as they had to be imported from overseas: coffee in particular, which throughout was replaced by substitutes made from roasted grains. Vegetables and local fruit were not rationed; imported citrus fruits and bananas were unavailable. In more rural areas, farmers continued to bring their products to the markets, as large cities depended on long distance delivery. Many people kept rabbits for their meat when it became scarce in shops, and it was often a child's job to care for them each day.

By spring 1945, food distribution and the ration system were increasingly in collapse, due to insurmountable transportation disruption and the rapid advance of the Allied armies from west and east with consequent loss of food storage facilities. In Berlin, at the start of the Battle of Berlin, the authorities announced a special supplementary food ration on 20 April 1945. It consisted of a pound (450 g) of bacon or sausage, half a pound of rice, half a pound of peas or pulses, a pound of sugar, four ounces (110 g) of coffee substitute, one ounce of real coffee, and a tin of vegetables or fruit. They also announced that standard food ration allocations for the next fortnight could be claimed in advance. The extra allocation of rations were dubbed by Berliners Himmelfahrtsrationen, Ascension-day rations, "because with these rations we shall now ascend to heaven"

==== Nursing ====
Germany had a very large and well organized nursing service, with three main organizations, one for Catholics, one for Protestants, and the DRK (Red Cross). In 1934 the Nazis set up their own nursing unit, the Brown nurses, which absorbed one of the smaller groups, bringing it up to 40,000 members. It set up kindergartens in competition with the other nursing organizations, hoping to seize control of the minds of the younger Germans. Civilian psychiatric nurses who were Nazi party members participated in the killing of invalids, although this was shrouded in euphemisms and denials.

Military nursing was primarily handled by the DRK, which came under partial Nazi control. Frontline medical services were provided by male doctors and medics. Red Cross nurses served widely within the military medical services, staffing the hospitals that perforce were close to the front lines and at risk of bombing attacks. Two dozen were awarded the highly prestigious Iron Cross for heroism under fire. They are among the 470,000 German women who served with the military.

==== Displaced persons ====
The conquest of Germany in 1945 freed 11 million foreigners, called "displaced persons" (DPs)- chiefly forced laborers and POWs. In addition to the POWs, the Germans seized 2.8 million Soviet workers to labor in factories in Germany. Returning them home was a high priority for the Allies. However, in the case of Russians and Ukrainians returning often meant suspicion or prison or even death. The UNRRA, Red Cross and military operations provided food, clothing, shelter and assistance in returning home. In all, 5.2 million were repatriated to the Soviet Union, 1.6 million to Poland, 1.5 million to France, and 900,000 to Italy, along with 300,000 to 400,000 each to Yugoslavia, Czechoslovakia, the Netherlands, Hungary, and Belgium.

==== Refugees ====
In 1944–45, over 2.5 million ethnic Germans fled from Eastern Europe in family groups, desperately hoping to reach Germany before being overtaken by the Russians. Half a million died in the process, the survivors were herded into refugee camps in East and West Germany for years. Meanwhile, Moscow encouraged its troops to regard German women as targets for revenge. Russian Marshal Georgi Zhukov called on his troops to, "Remember our brothers and sisters, our mothers and fathers, our wives and children tortured to death by Germans....We shall exact a brutal revenge for everything." Upwards of two million women inside Germany were raped in 1945 in a tidal wave of looting, burning and vengeance.

=== Japan ===
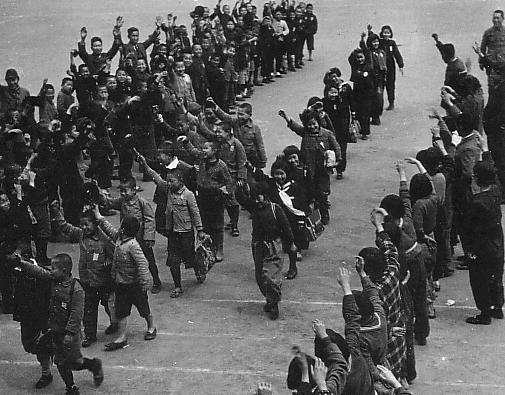
Japanese schoolchildren evacuating to rural areas in 1944

The Japanese home front was elaborately organized, block by block, with full-scale food rationing and many controls over labor. The government used propaganda heavily and planned in minute detail regarding the mobilization of manpower, identification of critical choke points, food supplies, logistics, air raid shelters, and the evacuation of children and civilians from targeted cities. Food supplies were very tight before the heavy bombing began in fall 1944, then grew to a crisis. There was only a small increase of 1.4 million women entering the labor force between 1940 and 1944. Intense propaganda efforts by the government to promote savings and postpone consumer purchases were largely successful, especially on the part of housewives who generally controlled their family budget. The minister of welfare announced, "In order to secure its labor force, the enemy is drafting women, but in Japan, out of consideration for the family system, we will not draft them."

In Japan, each neighborhood had a neighborhood association or Tonarigumi which consisted of a handful of households which were responsible for keeping up with the war effort. These associations would meet several times a week to discuss war related decisions and make them. The Tonarigumi fell under the community councils or chōnaikai which usually had several city blocks under one unit if it was in an urban area while in a rural area this usually consisted of one to two villages.

The weaknesses in the maximum utilization of womanpower was indicated by the presence of 600,000 domestic servants in wealthy families in 1944. The government wanted to raise the birthrate, even with 8.2 million men in the armed forces, of whom three million were killed. Government incentives helped to raise the marriage rate, but the number of births held steady at about 2.2 million per year, with a 10% decline in 1944–45, and another 15% decline in 1945–46. Strict rationing of milk led to smaller babies. There was little or no long-term impact on the overall demographic profile of Japan.

The government began making evacuation plans in late 1943, and started removing entire schools from industrial cities to the countryside, where they were safe from bombing and had better access to food supplies. In all 1.3 million children were moved—with their teachers but not their parents. When the American bombing began in earnest in late 1944, 10 million people fled the cities to the safety of the countryside, including two-thirds of the residents of the largest cities and 87% of the children. Left behind were the munitions workers and government officials. By April 1945, 87% of the younger children had been moved to the countryside. Air defense was largely ineffective during the war as civilians were given conflicting instructions, not many fire trucks were available along with a shortage of fuel existing for them and the governmental response was weak. Initially civil defense was done by the Home Ministry starting in 1937 but it lacked much authority before it was replaced by the Air Defense General Headquarters. Fire stations often did not have much fuel available due to strict rationing. The most that was done came from two organizations who competed with each other: the Greater Japan Air Defense Association and the Greater Japan Fire Defense Association.

Civil defense units were transformed into combat units, especially the Peoples Volunteer Combat Corps, enlisting civilian men up to the age of 60 and women to age 40. Starting in January 1945 the government operated an intensive training program to enable the entire civilian population to fight the "decisive battle" with the American invaders using grenades, explosive gliders and bamboo spears. Everyone understood they would probably die in what the government called the "Grand Suicide of the One Hundred Million." Health conditions became much worse after the surrender in September 1945, with so much housing stock destroyed, and an additional 6.6 million Japanese repatriated from Manchuria, China, Indochina, Formosa, Korea, Saipan and the Philippines.

From 1894 until the end of World War II all new areas acquired by Japan were placed under marital law which applied to all civilians.

==== Civilian sentiment and government war efforts ====
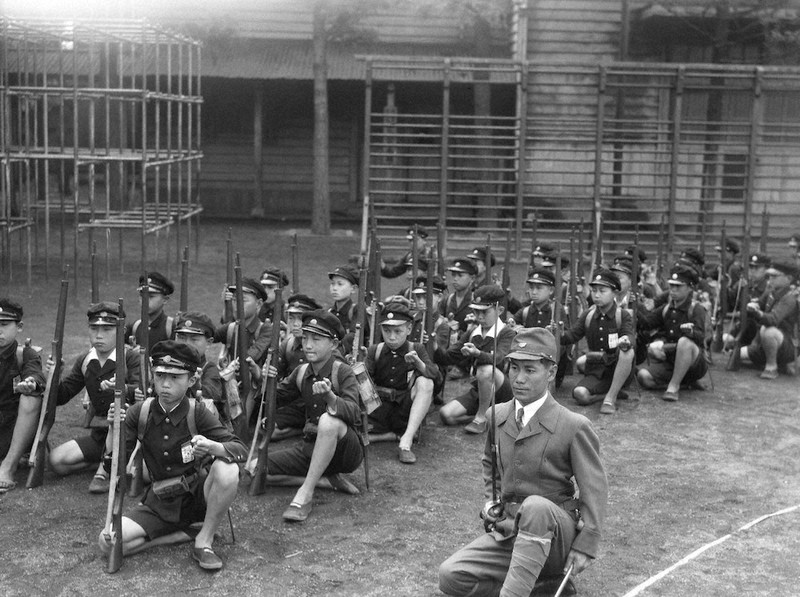
Elementary school students participating in military training, May 1942

There was great civilian support for the war by July 1937. The successful Japanese invasion of Manchuria in the early 1930s fueled the rise of aggressive foreign policy and radical nationalism. Japanese shimbuns' and radio stations' reporting of the events helped spread this sentiment quickly. Understanding the benefits of educating the populace about war efforts, the Japanese government soon followed suit. Starting in January 1938, ten minutes of war news was broadcast at 7:30 pm every day.

At the start of the war, the Home Ministry of Japan established more campaigns to generate support for the war. For instance, citizens were encouraged to avoid luxuries and save wealth for the state. The government even reformed its education system by rewriting ethics textbooks to be more nationalistic and militaristic. Schoolchildren were also taught nationalistic songs such as the Umi Yukaba:

"If I go away to the sea,
I shall be a corpse washed up.
If I go away to the mountain,
I shall be a corpse in the grass
But if I die for the Emperor,
It will not be a regret."

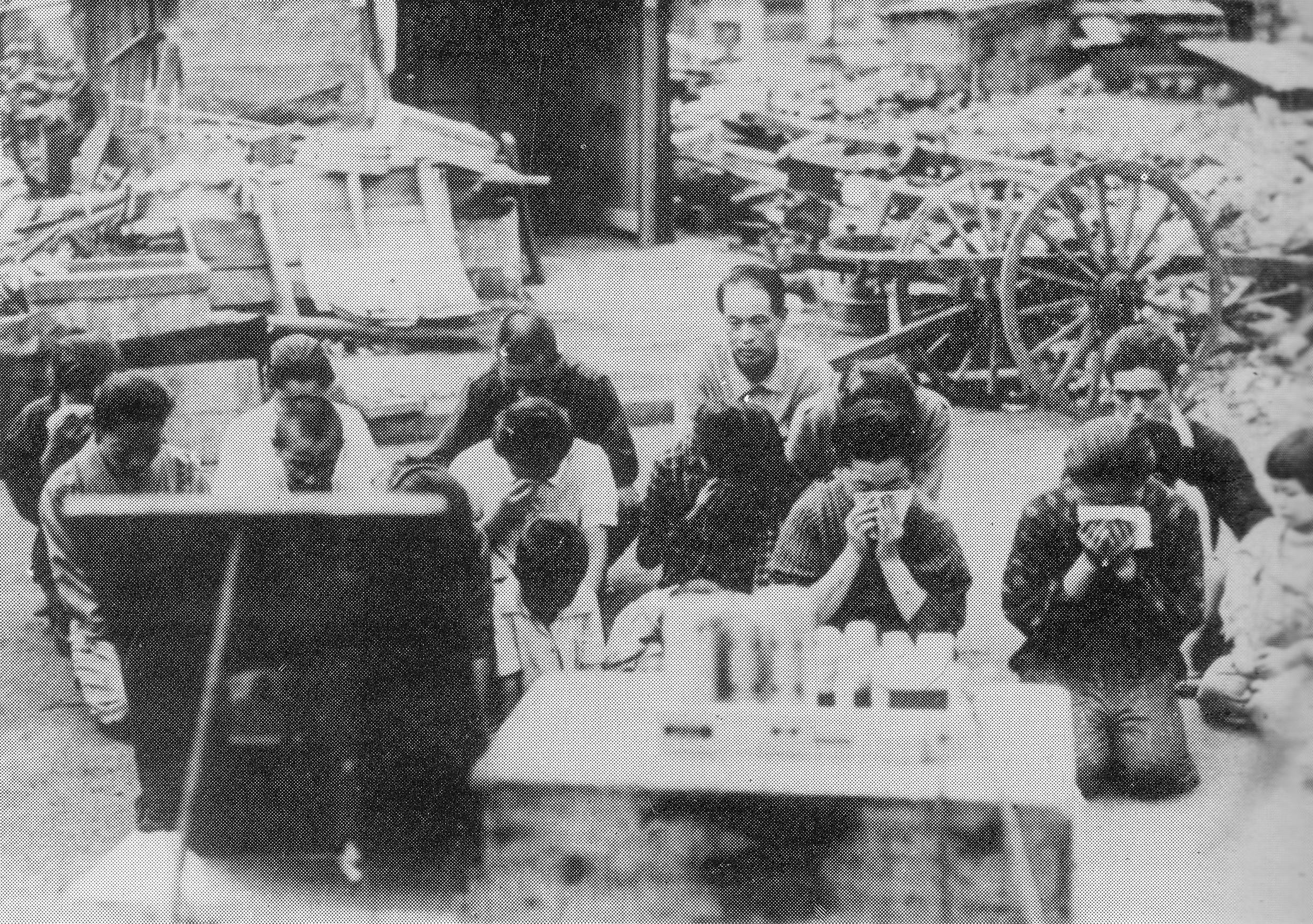
Civilians listening to the emperor's surrender broadcast, on 15 August 1945

In 1937, the Shinmin no michi (The Way of the Subjects) was given to all Japanese citizens in order to teach them how they should behave. Similarly, the Japanese war ministry issued the Senjinkun (Field Service Code) in 1941, which tried to educate the soldiers on how to behave during wartime. Specifically, the Senjinkun contained the famous ideal of no-surrender which inspired many Japanese servicemen to commit suicide than risk capture or surrender. Observation of civilian wartime diaries and letters suggest that the government was successful in garnering massive support for the war. Despite the rationing that causes food shortages, many Japanese were happy to oblige. Sakamoto Kane, Kōchi housewife wrote: "For fish, the community council gave us a distribution of only shrimp and swordfish; we can't get either pork or beef. I have the feeling that little by little there will be shortages but that in war, we must aim for frugality even in small ways and we must be careful about waste–for the sake of the country." Such sentiments were very common in Japan.

Further speaking to the success of the Japanese government, there were only ~1000 deserters every year for the six years of World War II. In comparison, ~40,000 Americans and more than 100,000 British servicemen deserted during World War II. While there was some resistance from the Japanese, most were supportive of the efforts. In fact, many were prepared to fight against the invaders if the opportunity came. In some areas of Japan, women practiced fighting with bamboo spears; girls vowed to kill at least one invader before they died; children practiced throwing balls in anticipation that they would be throwing grenades at the enemy. There were even reports of mass civilian suicides near the end of World War II, an attempt to avoid capture. This was partially due to loyalty for the emperor and fear tactics from the Japanese government, which had spread misinformation that the American soldiers would commit atrocities against innocent civilians. For the other Japanese civilians, there was a general sense of sorrow at the time of Japan's surrender. Inoue Tarō, a Japanese teenager who was tasked with war work, wrote a statement in his diary at the announcement that Japan had surrendered: "Cry! Let's cry until we can't any longer. Later we'll probably see the outpouring of a new power."

Japan during the war was a totalitarian society which had strict limits on expression. There were around 2,500 political prisoners in the country by the end of the war.

Number of Japanese Soldiers that Deserted or Defected
Year	1939	1943	1944
Defectors	669	20	40
Deserters	669*	1023	1085

*669 is the combined number of deserters and defectors in 1939.

===== Foreign nationals =====
The number of foreign nationals in Japan stood at 27,185 in June 1942. During the war, foreign nationals who came from allied nations were placed in civilian internment camps. Japanese-Americans in Japan during World War II were left alone.

==== Propaganda and censorship ====
Censorship was practiced in Japan during World War II with censorship becoming more strict after the Attack on Pearl Harbor. All magazines and newspapers were censored by the government starting in 1937. Also that year, the Foreign Ministry and Greater East Asia Ministry started to censor any information about foreign relations while the War and Navy ministries would have the task of censoring military news. The news was prohibited from showing casualties or injuries along with any other picture that could weaken the public attitude to fight in the war. Some of those who wrote stories that censors did not like were either tortured for 3 month periods or were imprisoned for a year without being allowed to take showers. Newspaper articles that passed censorship during the Japanese invasion of China glorified the actions of Japanese soldiers and accused the Chinese government of committing atrocities on Japanese people along with disrupting peace in Eastern Asia.

The government would try to replace certain words in Japanese that were associated with the Americans with different ones with an example being: the Japanese word "sukkatto" (skirt) became known as "hakama" (a Japanese formal skirt).

===== Physical visual arts =====
Japan took an anti-western approach to art during the war. Over time more government control was imposed on art. During the war the government and military commissioned artists to make sensōga (war art) which were paintings of battles. Approximately 300 artists worked with the military during the war and followed them which was a practice that started in 1938.

During the war art supplies were in low supply and one could only get art supplies from official outlets. Artists who decided to collaborate with the authorities were guaranteed art supplies, their work being exhibited and also getting their work mass published. In 1943 the Patriotic Society of Japanese Art was formed by the Ministry of Education to mobilize artists and every artist was required to join. In 1944 the Patriotic Society of Japanese Art took over all activities pertaining to art exhibitions.

Another means in which Japan tried to control the visual arts was by limiting and consolidating the number of art magazines that were available.

===== Radio =====
Radio was heavily censored in Japan during World War II. In 1941 Japan had 6.6 million radio sets making it the 4th highest country in terms of radio set ownership in the world and over 45% of homes. The government made an effort to grow the number of radios similar to Nazi Germany. Two years after the Marco Polo bridge incident, jazz music was taken off the radio for being deemed "un-Japanese" along with music in foreign languages with the exception of German and Italian songs. Starting in April 1944 music that was played on either a: banjo, ukulele and a guitar were prohibited from being played on the radio with music from Japanese instruments being promoted instead.

===== Film =====
In September 1937 a ban was announced on all imported foreign films. Prior to this 80% of the foreign film market was from the United States. This ban was lifted in 1939 with the 1939 Film Law placing "protectionist measures", a quota on movies along with other censorship restrictions and were later banned entirely with the start of the Pacific War in 1941. American music was also banned that year.

===== Diaries =====
Soldiers, teenagers and children in Japan were required to keep a diary and write entries in it along with being subjected to inspection by their superiors. Later in 1944 this was extended to the 1.3 million children who were urban evacuees living in the countryside. The diaries and letters of civilian adults were not subject to any direct monitoring.

==== Production and rationing ====
===== Food =====
Agricultural production in the home islands held up well during the war until the bombing started. It fell from an index of 110 in 1942 to 84 in 1944 and only 65 in 1945. Worse, imports dried up. Food rationing began in 1938 and the food rationing system was effective throughout the war, and there were no serious incidences of malnutrition. A government survey in Tokyo showed that in 1944 families depended on the black market for 9% of their rice, 38% of their fish, and 69% of their vegetables. The government was involved in a variety of other ways beyond implementing rationing; with price controls being implemented on perishable food in September 1939 and "By 1942, rice, wheat, barley, and rye were monopolized by the government".

The Japanese domestic food supply depended upon imports, which were largely cut off by the American submarine and bombing campaigns. Likewise there was little deep sea fishing, so that the fish ration by 1941 was mostly squid harvested from coastal waters. The result was a growing food shortage, especially in the cities. There was some malnutrition but no reported starvation. Despite government rationing of food, some families were forced to spend more than their monthly income could offer on black market food purchases. They would rely on savings or exchange food for clothes or other possessions. To try and make up for food, open urban areas were dedicated to food production and many households had their own gardens.

Japanese rice supply
Year	1937	1938	1939	1940	1941	1942	1943	1944	1945
Domestic production	9,928	9,862	10,324	9,107	8,245	9,999	9,422	8,784	6,445
Imports	2,173	2,546	1,634	1,860	2,517	2,581	1,183	874	268
All rice	12,101	12,408	11,958	10,967	10,762	12,580	10,605	9,658	6,713

===== Non-food items =====
The Japanese government in 1938 started rationing gasoline. When war with the US appeared imminent, practically all gasoline was prohibited for civilian usage. Oil was also banned for non-military industries. Starting in the 1890s, Japan tried to develop its own oil industry, and although oil extractions efforts proved insufficient, they had 21 refineries in the Japanese home islands by 1941. Japan implemented a seven-year-plan in 1937 to increase oil production in the home islands but did not fully succeed. The Japanese obtained the oil rich areas of British Malaya and the Dutch East Indies and were able to use the preexisting facilities but they were often not able to transport this back home as tankers were often sunk. To deal with a lack of oil and gasoline, the Japanese resorted to a number of other fuel sources such as relying more on Ethanol, creating biofuel variants of diesel and working with pine oil which was largely unsuccessful; however charcoal was still used in large amounts mostly for homes and light industry which did contribute to deforestation.

Japan stepped up its lumber production to reduce dependence starting in the early 1930s, a process that accelerated during the war. Between 1941 and 1945, around 15% of Japan's forests were cut down, corresponding to 36,000 square kilometres (14,000 sq mi). Efforts for reforestation made during the war were unsuccessful.

Japan was able to produce more electricity than Italy did in any given year during the war (1939 to 1945) and initially produced more than the United Kingdom. However, Japan's electricity output started declining in 1943, allowing the UK to overtake it. Its primary sources were coal and hydroelectric dams.

==== Deaths ====
The American aerial bombing of a total of 65 Japanese cities took from 400,000 to 600,000 civilian lives, with 100,000+ in Tokyo alone, over 200,000 in Hiroshima and Nagasaki combined. The Battle of Okinawa resulted in 80,000–150,000 civilian deaths. In addition civilian death among settlers who died attempting to return to Japan from Manchuria in the winter of 1945 were probably around 100,000. The total of Japanese military fatalities between 1937 and 1945 were 2.1 million; most came in the last year of the war and were caused by starvation or severe malnutrition in garrisons cut off from supplies.

==== Japanese women ====
According to oral history studied by Thomas Havens, traditional paternalistic norms proved a barrier when the government wanted to exploit woman power more fully for the war effort. Compulsory employment in munitions factories was possible for unmarried women, but social norms prevented married women from doing that sort of work, in sharp contrast to Russia, Britain, Germany and the United States. The absence of so many young men dramatically disrupted long-standing patterns of marriage, fertility, and family life. Severe shortages of ordinary items, including food and housing, were far more oppressive than governmental propaganda efforts. Japanese women obediently followed orders, and there were no serious disruptions such as rioting over food shortages. Forced prostitution for the benefit of Japanese soldiers created the "comfort women" program that proved highly embarrassing to Japan for decades after the war. Non-Japanese women from colonies such as Korea and Formosa were especially vulnerable.

Beginning in the late 20th century cultural historians turned their attention to the role of women in wartime, especially the Second World War. Sources often used include magazines published—by men—for female readers. Typically fictional and nonfictional stories focused on social roles as mothers and wives, especially in dealing with hardships of housing and food supplies, and financial concerns in the absence of men at war. Problems of fashion wartime were a high priority in such magazines in all major countries. Historians report that the Japanese textile and fashion industries were highly successful in adapting to wartime shortages and propaganda needs. Magazines for teenage girls emphasized they must follow patriotic demands that compelled them to give up their adolescent freedoms and transform themselves from "shōjo", which connotes adolescent playfulness, into "gunkoku shōjo" [girls of a military nation], with significant home front responsibilities. Evacuation of women and children from the major cities, out of fear of Allied bombing, was covered in detail to emphasize willingness to sacrifice for patriotism portrayed through fiction, news articles and photographs. The government controlled all the media, and supervised popular magazines so their content would strategically spread the government's goals and propaganda.

==== Transportation ====
Prior to the war in 1939 Japan had the world's 3rd largest merchant marine fleet (in terms of gross tons) and it was at 5,630,000 gross tons. The production of ships during the war ramped up. This came after an effort by the government to produce more ships as until 1937 the number of merchant marine ships were decreasing due to retirements of outdated vessels. Land transportation also changed as well during the war and the immediate years before it. Starting in 1938 rationing was introduced for gasoline and by 1941 civilian cars were prohibited from using gasoline though the number of cars was quite low compared to other developed countries prior to the war; and of these cars most were used for buses and taxis. During the war passenger railroad travel was suppressed while cargo and military transport were prioritized. Railroads were used to evacuate children to the countryside from the urban areas during the war. The Kanmon Railway Tunnel was built during the war connecting Kyushu and Honshu with initially freight travel being allowed before passenger travel was later allowed.

==== Condition at war's end ====
Health and living conditions worsened after the surrender in September 1945. Most of the housing stock in large cities was destroyed, just as refugees tried to return from the rural areas. Adding to the crisis there was an influx of 3.5 million returning soldiers and 3.1 million Japanese civilians forcibly repatriated from Imperial outposts in Manchuria, China, Indochina, Formosa, Korea, Saipan and the Philippines; about 400,000 civilians were left behind and not heard of again. Meanwhile, 1.2 million Koreans, POWs and other non-Japanese left Japan. The government implemented pro-natalist policies, which led to an increase in the marriage rate, but birth rates remained steady until they declined by 10% in the stress of the last year of the war, and another 15% during the hardship of the postwar period.

The American bombing campaign of all major cities severely impacted the economy, as did the shortages of oil and raw materials that intensified when Japanese merchant shipping was mostly sunk by American submarines. When industrial production was available to the military, for example, 24 percent of Japan's finished steel in 1937 was allocated to the military, compared to 85 percent in 1945. By the end of the war, output percent of the highest capacity was still 100 percent for steel, although only 75 percent for aluminum, 63 percent for machine tools, 42 percent for vacuum tubes, 54 percent cement, 32 percent cotton fabric, and 36 percent for wool.

=== Italy ===
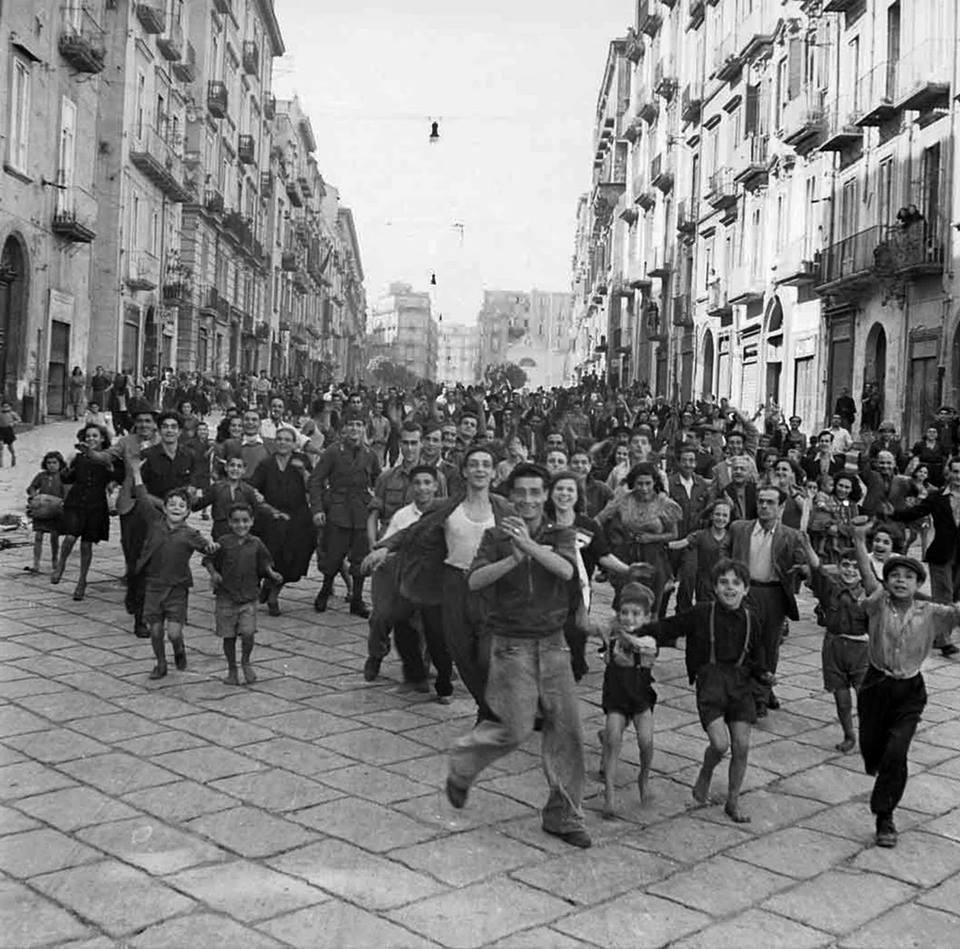
People in Naples welcoming Allied troops on 1 October 1943

When Italy first entered World War II, the public was initially enthusiastic but later support for the war decreased and the general public became hostile to it.

==== Food rationing and production ====
Rationing was practiced during the war with rations in 1940 being put on coffee, pasta, rice, sugar and oils with meat and bread being applied the following year. Food shortages existed prior to entering the war and worsened during it as the government tried doing price controls prior to the war. The reason for food shortages was a lack of labor and the reduced supply of fertilizer which was caused by a shortage of laborers. Riots over food broke out in Cerignola located in southern Italy in 1941. When the allies arrived in Italy it did not solve food problems as the German army took a scorched earth approach destroying what was left on the way and taking the food. Germany went as far as planting mines on agricultural land and releasing convicts. Due to the food situation many resorted to the black market.

By the time of World War II most of Italy's manufacturing (75%) was in the northern part of the country in the Piedmont, Lombardy and Ligurian regions of the country. Between 1933 and 1940 most of the new factories built or expanded upon in the country happened in the north (1,165 were built during this time and 1,808 preexisting plants were expanded) with the central part of the country, south along with Sicily and Sardinia seeing less plants; in that order being built or expanded upon. Many people left the south of Italy to find work in the industrial plants in the north.

During the time of World War II, Italy did not have any oil deposits in its own territory and mainly had to rely in importing their own oil. Deposits of oil in Libya were not yet discovered. Although Italy did not any oil deposits, it did have coal deposits but not enough for their own needs. Italy experienced a shortage of both coal and oil despite importing both. Italy tried to expand upon its already dominant hydroelectricity sector (Italy generated 92% of its electricity in 1939 from hydroelectricity) to reduce consumption of coal and oil but ran into difficulties building more of them due to supply difficulties.

==== Bombing ====
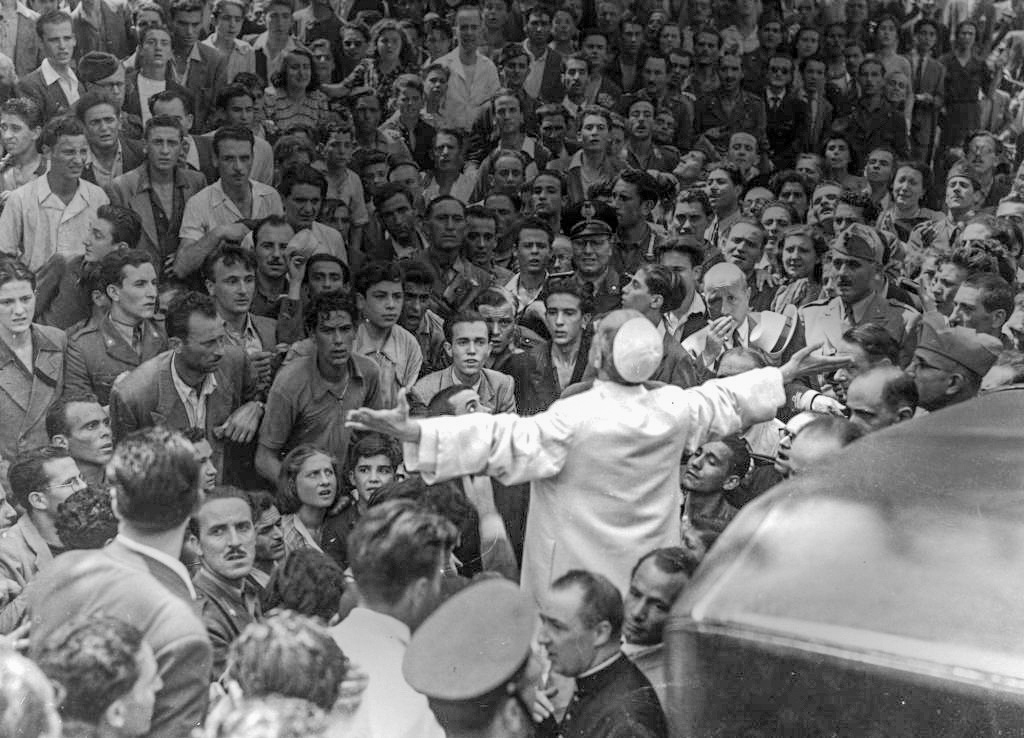
Pope Pius XII visits to the Lateran after the American air raid of Rome in 1943

Italy was often the subject of Allied aerial bombardment campaigns and efforts to stop them were often ineffective as the Italian Royal Air Force was lacking in training along with manpower and supplies, few anti-aircraft batteries existed until 1943, blackouts hours being often changed and the alarm system being ineffective. During the war the entirety of mainland Italy was affected and between 1940 and 1945 over 60,000 civilians were killed by bombing.

==== Jews in Italy ====
Starting in 1940 foreign Jews were placed in concentration camps and Italian Jewish adults were subjected to forced labor. Starting in 1938 on their own initiative, the Italian government began issuing anti-Jewish decrees which led to Jews being kicked out of schools, losing jobs and banning marriages between non-Jews and Jews. Jewish people would also become the subject of harassment as well.

=== Finland ===
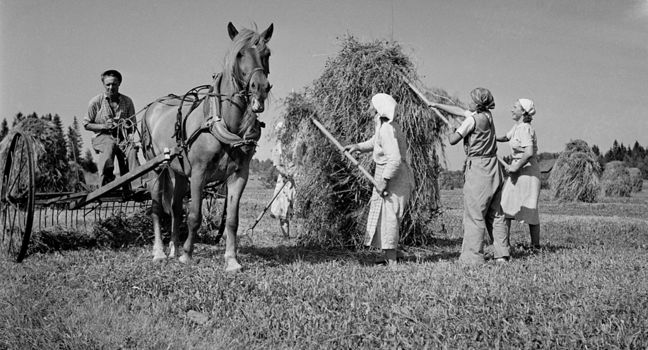
Haymaking in Finland, 1942

At the beginning of World War II, Finland was primarily an agricultural country; as farming and forestry made over 1/3rd the national economic output prior to the war with over half the population participating in these two areas. Prior to the war, Finland did not have any serious allies.

==== Food and production ====
During the late 1930s Finland was a self-sufficient country in terms of agricultural production as there had been good weather although being dependent on importing foreign fertilizers. In 1940, the loss of Karellia which made up 10% of all arable land in Finland resulted in agricultural production falling by a 1/4th in 1940. Finland would become dependent on Germany for imports of grain along with fertilizer and in general as foreign trade was cut off as the British surrounded the Pechenga region in June 1941 but trade with Sweden made up 10% of Finland's foreign trade. The agricultural harvest during the war years could only make up 2/3rd of the demand so the rest would have to be imported. Despite all of this, Finland had the smallest rations in Europe and many compensated for this by going to the black market despite the heavy penalties.

==== Labor ====
Finland required that all Finish citizens between 15 and 64 to work in either the war, agricultural, industry and/or other sectors required for "national defense" with the only exception being women with children under the age of 6. All male citizens in Finland were expected to serve in the military. Despite this there would be labor shortages and Finland in 1939 with 3.7 million people living there made it one of the smallest countries in Europe in terms of population.

== Famines ==
Severe food shortages were common throughout the war zones, especially in Europe where Germany used starvation as a military weapon. Japan did not use it as a deliberate policy, but the breakdown of its transportation and distribution systems led to famine and starvation conditions among its soldiers on many Pacific islands. Bose (1990) studies the three great Asian famines that took place during the war: Bengal in India, Honan in China, and Tonkin in Vietnam. In each famine at least two million people died. They all occurred in densely populated provinces where the subsistence foundations of agriculture was failing under the weight of demographic and market pressures. In each cases famine played a role in undermining the legitimacy of the state and the preexisting social structure.

== Housing ==
A great deal of housing was destroyed or largely damaged during the war, especially in the Soviet Union, Germany, and Japan. In Japan, about a third of the families were homeless at the end of the war. In Germany, about 25% of the total housing stock was destroyed or heavily damaged; in the main cities the proportion was about 45%. Elsewhere in Europe, 22% of the prewar housing in Poland was totally destroyed; 21% in Greece; 9% in Austria, 8% in the Netherlands; 8% in France, 7% in Britain, 5% Italy and 4% in Hungary.

== See also ==
- Economic warfare
- Lotta Svärd, women in Finland
- Military history of the British Commonwealth in the Second World War
- Military production during World War II
- Paper Salvage 1939–50
- Rosie the Riveter
- Squander Bug
- Utility furniture
- Veronica Foster
- Women in World War II
