= Boydell (name) =

Boydell is an English surname. Notable people with the surname include:

- Brian Boydell (1917–2000), Irish composer
- Jacqui Boydell (born 1968), Australian politician
- James Boydell (died 1860), British inventor
- John Boydell (1720–1804), British publisher
- Josiah Boydell (1752–1817), British publisher and painter
- Phillip Boydell (1896–1984), British designer and illustrator
