= Phillip Boydell =

British designer and illustrator

Phillip Boydell (1896 - 1984) was a British designer and illustrator.

== Life and work ==
Boydell was born on 21 May 1896 in Tyldesley Lancashire, to Oliver Boydell (a master decorator) and Merinda. He obtained a scholarship at the Manchester School of Art, but his studies were interrupted by conscription in 1914. During his service in the Royal Navy, his vessel the tugboat HMS Blackcock was lost off Murmansk in winter, but Boydell lived to tell the tale, and was able to continue his education at the Royal College of Art.

In 1923 he married sculptor Bertha White.

In 1926 he was offered the position of Art Director at the London Press Exchange, and was on the Board of Directors when he retired in 1961.

Boydell is best known for two posters and a typeface.

- The Squander Bug, a poster encouraging people not to spend money wastefully but invest in savings bonds, was so successful that derivatives were used in several other countries. This he created whilst in bed with influenza
- The Black Widow poster for road safety (for which Boydell was art director) which aroused controversy for its (in those days) relatively direct approach.
- The Festival font was the official typeface for the 1951 Festival of Britain, and was used in all the communications for the festival.

He died at home in 1984.
