= Squander Bug =

World War II propaganda character

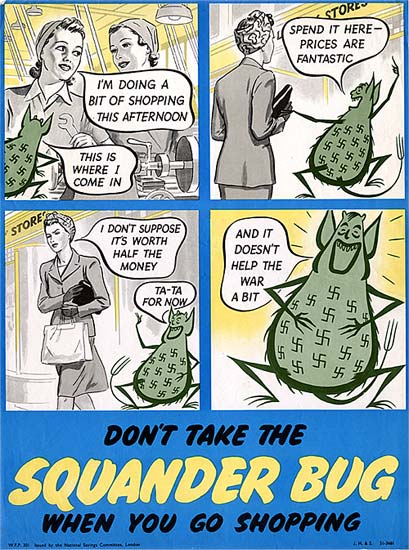
Squander Bug poster

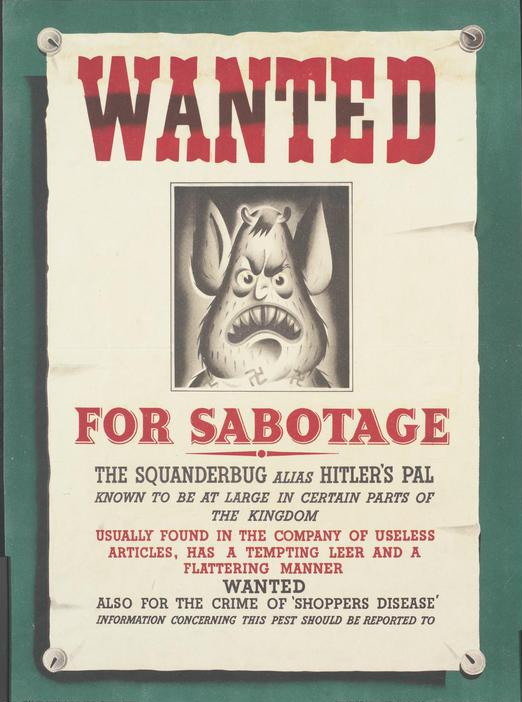
Poster comparing wasteful spending to sabotage

The Squander Bug was a World War II propaganda character created by the British National Savings Committee to discourage "wasteful" spending and consumption, in order to free up capital and resources for the war effort. Originally designed by freelance illustrator Phillip Boydell for press advertisements, the character was widely used by other wartime artists in poster campaigns and political cartoons. It is one of the few propaganda campaigns from World War II to be fully documented from the original concept sketches to the finished adverts.

== Creation ==
The first of Boydell's six original Squander Bug sketches, here with its original name of the 'Money Grub'.

During the Second World War, the British National Savings Committee became concerned that inflated prices were being paid for scarce consumer goods and believed that the money would be better spent on savings certificates to finance the war. The Committee felt that a way to ridicule indulgent spending was needed, without being boring or high-handed.

To meet this need, Boydell produced a series of six sketches depicting an imp-like creature named the 'Money Grub' that could 'push, pull, scratch, bite and steal'. The concept was accepted almost as it stood, aside from the name being changed.

The character was intended as a positive alternative to endless government warnings on what not to do, for example 'Don't waste fuel' or 'Don't waste paper'. Instead, the Squander Bug's speech balloons encouraged shoppers to waste their money on useless purchases, accompanied by captions urging consumers to fight or starve the creature. The character eventually gained swastika tattoos and was even placed in Madame Tussauds wax museum alongside other war enemies, such as Adolf Hitler and Benito Mussolini.

== Usage ==
Boydell was mainly involved in developing the Squander Bug for press adverts, but the character was also adapted for use in poster campaigns with the same message. British wartime cartoonists such as David Low and Carl Giles also used the character, sometimes ironically. For example, Victor Weisz lampooned Hitler's manpower shortages by giving him his own pair of squander bugs.

The character developed an international reputation, and an adapted version was used in Australia, where the Squander Bug was given a Japanese appearance. A Squander Bug character was also created by Dr. Seuss to encourage Americans to buy war bonds, although the design was quite different from Boydell's version.

== In media ==
The Squander Bug is referenced in the 60s/70s sitcom about the Home guard, Dad's Army, in the episode "Knights of Madness" (Series 9: Episode 3), with Private Pike (Ian Lavender) dressing up as the bug. A reference to the Squander Bug is also made by Phoebe Bamford "Dervla Kirwan" in the sitcom Goodnight Sweetheart Series 3 Episode 2, It Ain't Necessarily So.
