= Iandra Castle =

Iandra
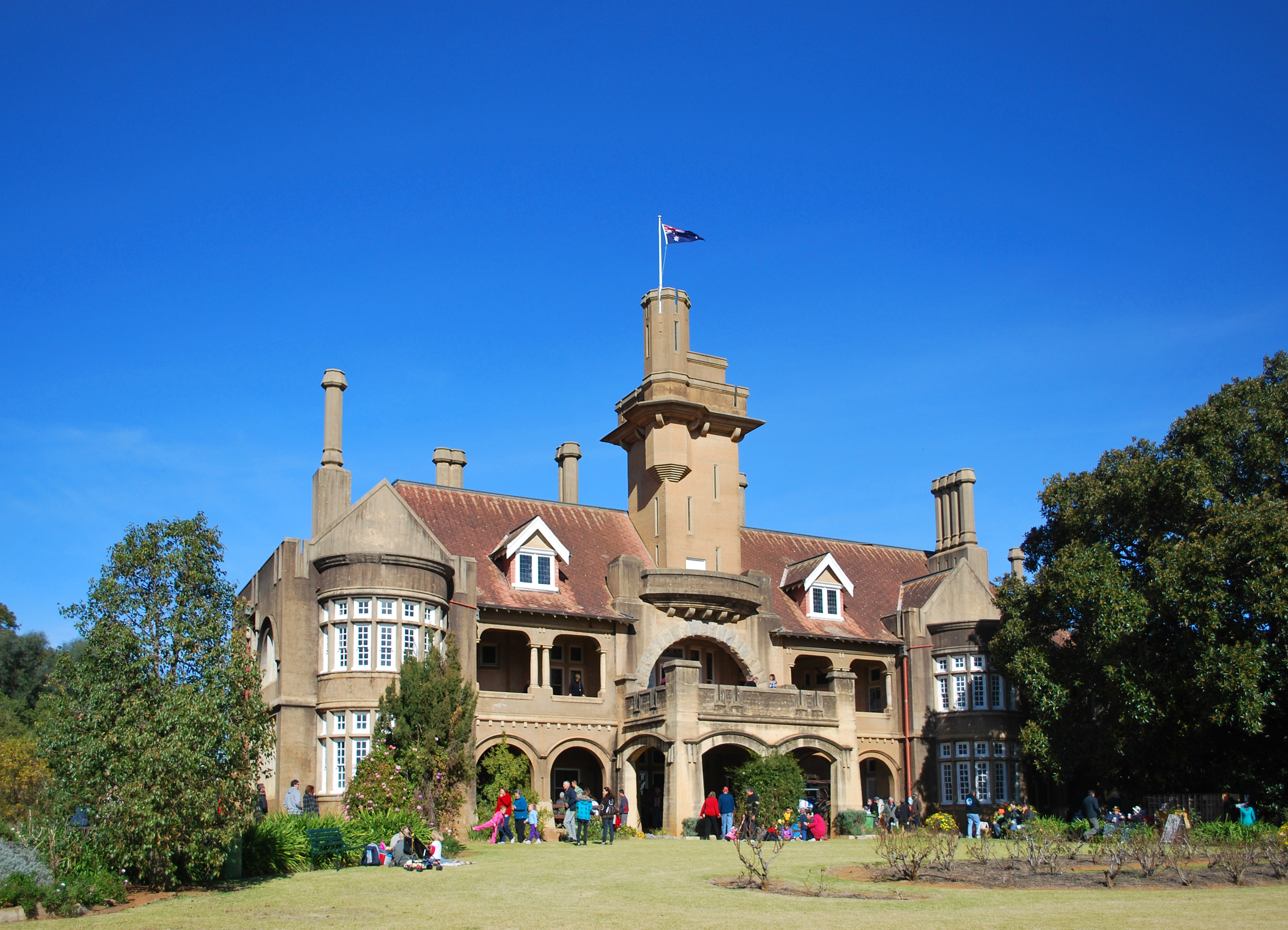

- Location within New South Wales
- Former names: Mount Oriel homestead

General information
- Type: House
- Architectural style: Federation Romanesque
- Location: Iandra Road, Greenethorpe, Weddin Shire, New South Wales, Australia
- Coordinates: 34°04′34″S 148°21′29″E
- Construction started: 1880
- Completed: 1910

Technical details
- Structural system: Reinforced concrete

Design and construction
- Architects: un-named (English architect); in association with Ellen Greene, the owner's wife
- Main contractor: Edward Giles Stone

New South Wales Heritage Register
- Official name: Iandra Homestead Pastoral Estate; The Castle; Mount Oriel
- Type: State heritage (landscape)
- Designated: 18 February 2005
- Reference no.: 1723
- Type: Farm
- Category: Farming and grazing
- Builders: Edward Giles Stone

Iandra (colloquially known as Iandra Castle) is a large heritage-listed homestead 11 kilometres (6.8 mi) south of Greenethorpe, in the Central West region of New South Wales, Australia. The property was added to the New South Wales State Heritage Register on 18 February 2005.

The homestead is a former Methodist Boys' home and working farmland. It was designed by an unnamed English architect, built by Edward Giles Stone, in association with Ellen Greene, the owner's wife, and was built between 1880 and 1910. The homestead is also known as The Castle and Mount Oriel homestead.

Greenethorpe is surrounded by the towns of Young (26 kilometres (16 mi) to the south), Grenfell (29 kilometres (18 mi) to the northwest) and Cowra (41 kilometres (25 mi) to the northeast).

== History ==
The land on which Iandra stands was first taken up for pastoral purposes in 1833 by John Wood, as part of his Brundah Station. Later the eastern part of Brundah was acquired by W. R. Watt and subsequently by J. A. Mackinnon.

George Greene was born in Ireland in 1838 and emigrated to the colony from Ireland in 1842 at the age of 4 with his father William Pomeroy Greene and the entire family. His father William chartered a ship to emigrate and brought out family servants such as chauffeur, cook, maids, their families, his personal library, a pre-fabricated house and much more. William Greene's grandfather was in the English diplomatic corps and had served in India. William Greene had been in the Royal Navy and served on St.Helena where Napoleon Bonaparte was kept on house arrest. It was here that he had caught a "fever" (probably tuberculosis) and was retired from the Navy. He then acted as agent (effectively estate manager) to Lord Oriel's estate in Ireland. Lord Oriel was the last Speaker of the Irish House of Commons. Greene's doctor recommended that he move to a more warm, amenable climate.

George Greene spent his youth with his family at Woodlands near Bulla, north of Melbourne. After he married Ellen Crawford, the daughter of an Indian Army Officer, he sold his land interest and returned to England.

In 1878 George Greene returned to Australia and bought 13,000 hectares (32,000 acres) near Grenfell, New South Wales from Mackinnon, which he called Mount Oriel (named after the estate of Lord Oriel in Ireland which his father had been agentfor prior to emigrating to Australia. It was later renamed Iandra. This vast estate encompassed the majority of the parish which was to derive its name from this estate, that is, the Iandra Parish. In 1880 Greene had a brick dwelling built using bricks made on the property, the original Mount Oriel single storey homestead. This was sited on Portion 49 of the Iandra Parish of 260 hectares (640 acres).

The purchase in 1878 by Greene represented the beginning of a new era for the area and the nation's wheat industry. Iandra became the largest and most progressive wheat property in Australia. Here George Greene pioneered his vast share-farming enterprise in 1892 that revolutionised the approach to wheat growing, whereby he supplied the land and seed and the share farmer provided the labour. By 1911, fifty share farmers had been established on 7,300 hectares (18,000 acres), generally on share farms of 640 acres (260 ha) each, extending across the Parish of Iandra.

The property was also at the forefront of wheat growing technology in Australia. Greene increased production by scientific use of superphosphate fertiliser, rotation between grazing and wheat fallowing. Iandra was used as the first large scale trial of Federation "rust proof" wheat developed by William Jame Farrer, and Greene was the first to grow the wheat commercially. Greene was also one of the first in New South Wales to fully fence his property with rabbit proof netting.

An ambitious scheme of land clearing, fencing and building ensued that was so successful that, before the turn of the (20th) century, the homestead and its extensive outbuildings and handsome small Gothic stone church became a showpiece which attracted flocks of visitors. Some forty houses were built on the estate for share farmers.

Greene as a member of both houses of the Parliament of New South Wales and through his connections with Lord Northcott, Governor-General of Australia (Northcott stayed at Iandra in 1908) was instrumental in securing the Grenfell branch rail line from Koonawatha to the Grenfell railway station and then to Greenethorpe/Iandra. This allowed ready access and export of grain and of goods, effectively opening up the district's production and potential. This was part of railway engineer J. J. C. Bradfield's program of branch line expansion in New South Wales.

Soon after the turn of the century, Iandra had produced the largest ever yield of wheat from a single property of 100,000 bags of wheat. The harvest saw a concentration of labour forces of a scale not previously witnessed in rural New South Wales. Five to six hundred men were engaged in various aspects of the operation. As a social enterprise, share farming at Iandra appears to have benefited workers and management alike.

In 1908 Greene began the construction of a village around the Iandra rail siding to house and improve the living conditions of his tenant farmers. This village was named Greenethorpe after its pioneer. Greenethorpe Village was based on the English manor system where a number of tenant farms were based around a single manor, in this instance the Iandra homestead. A church was built here and Greene discouraged but failed to prevent the eventual construction of a public house in the village.

George Henry Greene's son, William Pomeroy Crawford Greene registered a coat of arms in 1908 with the Ulster King of Arms in Dublin. This coat of arms had been "borne and used by his family" for some time and can be described as on a blue shield three golden stags inside a gold border. Above the shield emerging from a gold coronet the head of a stag also gold, marked with a green shamrock on the neck. Motto "Nec timeo nec sperno" (translation:"I neither fear nor despise").

In 1908-1910 Greene constructed the present 57-room two storey homestead, incorporating the original 1880 dwelling (all that appears to remain is one brick wall. It took full advantage of its elevated setting with wide district views. The Federation Romanesque homestead was a large, idiosyncratic castle-like building constructed of reinforced concrete, and became known as The Castle. The new house was designed by an English architect with influence from Greene's wife, Ellen and built by engineer Edward G Stone. Interior panelling was of oak (Quercus sp.) and the dining room of Queensland black walnut (Castanospermum australe). A fence was built around the grounds by Greene's son, Captain William C. Greene.

At the same time, the manager's residence and stables were also constructed, reportedly to the design of the same architect. A church was also constructed on the property to the south, uphill, during Greene's ownership (in 1886). George Greene, his wife (d.1921), and their two sons were (eventually) all buried in the cemetery here.

Greene played a prominent role in rural affairs and was a member of the Young Pastures and Stock Protection Board 1881-84, being its chairman from 1885 to 1888. In 1890 he became a foundation member of the Pastoralists Union of New South Wales. Greene was the Legislative Assembly Member for Grenfell in 1889-91, 1894 and 1895–98, during which time he was able to obtain a rail link to Grenfell. In 1899 he became a Member of the Legislative Council. Greene died in 1911 and was buried at Iandra. When his widow, Ellen Greene returned to England, the property was managed by L. N. I'Anson.

By 1911 the estate consisted of 60 sharefarmers on the original 13,000 hectares (32,000 acres).

From c. 1914, the Greene family moved back to England and their empire was broken-up for the first time by George's Cambridge-educated son and in the majority of cases the share farmers were given the option of buying the land they had been farming, generally 260-hectare (640-acre) blocks.

In 1927, following the death of Ellen Greene, Iandra and 1,000 hectares (2,500 acres) were purchased by the estate manager since 1911, Leonard Nourse I'Anson. I'Anson (1925-1949) first settled at Iandra in 1906, when he discovered the area while resting the wagonette horses at Cowra, when moving from South Australia to Victoria. Family accounts report that after riding round the district that night I'Anson said to the others "If this country can grow trees this size, I'm not going any further." This began a 70-year association of multiple generations of the I'Anson family with the Iandra estate over most of the 20th Century. The I'Anson family owned Iandra until 1956, and his grandson, Keith I'Anson (b.1925), continued to own part of the estate until 1976.

The homestead and estate during the ownership of Henry Greene and the I'Anson family played a major role in not only the establishment of the village and community, but in the social life of the community. The property was said to have generally deteriorated after the death of Leonard I'Anson in 1949 when it was managed by his sons who also had other properties to manage.

In 1956 the homestead and 320 hectares (800 acres) of the farmland were transferred to the Methodist Church for A£10,000 for use as a home for first-time male offenders from the city, as well as a dairy and an intensive poultry programme. A managerial council was formed to oversee administration of the home, comprising Greenethorpe locals from the strong Methodist community and church representatives.

1200 acres of the estate on the eastern side of the road, plus 6.9 hectares (17 acres) adjoining the homestead including the coachman's house, silo and water tank and several sheds were transferred to Keith I'Anson.

As part of the Church's use of the site for a detention home, a c. 1960s toilet block was constructed at the rear (west) of the main homestead, attached to a brick garden wall. The Methodist Boys Home use continued until 1974.

In 1974 and 1976 both parts of the estate were transferred to David Morris of Rylstone, a civil engineer and owner of R. S. Morris. At one time it was in a very poor state of repair. The homestead was faithfully restored by David Morris.

The widow of Morris continues to live in the house today, and the property continues to operate as a working farm. The estate now comprises approximately 1,200 hectares (3,000 acres) of the original 13,000-hectare (32,000-acre) Greene estate.

The present owners of the property open the homestead on designated weekends throughout the year when it is possible to wander through the beautifully maintained gardens. The owner's wife cares for the garden and despite the severe drought conditions, has created a very picturesque surrounding area to complement the homestead. In spring the garden features clumps of purple iris, daffodils, roses and lemon trees.

In 2007-09, two grants were awarded to prepare a conservation management plan for the homestead, and for conservation works to the homestead and gardens, Stallion Shed, Blacksmith's Shop, Hayshed, Accountant's Cottage, Gardener's Cottage and Blade Shearing Shed. In 2009, a new toilet block was erected to the south-west of the homestead, alongside the existing toilet block.

== Description ==
The Iandra estate of approximately 1,200 hectares (3,000 acres) comprises land of approximately 338 hectares (835 acres):

- the main homestead;
- the stables and electrical generating plant;
- manager's residence;
- surrounding garden/park setting;
- chapel and cemetery;
- blacksmith's shop;
- hay shed;
- stallion shed;
- accountant's cottage;
- workers' cottage;
- water filter in dam;
- water tower and;
- woolshed;
- surrounding farmland, originally in 260-hectare (640-acre) share-farms.

=== Farm setting ===
Approximately 1,200 hectares (3,000 acres) comprises land of approximately 338 hectares (835 acres) of cropping and grazing land, within which sits the main dwelling, stables, barns and yards group.

=== Surrounding garden and parkland ===
The homestead group (stables, barns, yards, manager's residence, house and garden) sit on a rise with panoramic views of the entire district. Around the complex are shelter belts of pepper(corn) trees (Schinus molle).

The entry gates (iron, curlicued shaped panels) are flanked by white picket fencing. A long gravel drive approaches the house from Iandra Road from the gates at the north-eastern corner of the garden/parkland and ending in a parking area to the house's east. A driveway continues east/south-east of the house to the stables/garage. The main drive is lined with a double avenue of kurrajong (Brachychiton populneus) and bottlebrush (Callistemon spp.) trees and shrubs. A wide lawn fronts the northern (main/front) facade of the house. A smaller lawn area adjoins to the eastern, southern and western sides. The southern side is also marked by a paved courtyard between wings of the house and a rear driveway to the stables /garage block and yards beyond, further south.

A side gate further south on Iandra Road connects through an avenue of Persian lilac bushes (see below) to the rear of the house and service yard, stables/garage etc.

Another gate further south on Iandra Road leads into the Manager's residence.

Another gate further south and uphill on Iandra Road leads to the Chapel and cemetery.

The oldest remains of the Greene-era garden are the numerous groves of monumentally scaled Moreton Bay fig trees (Ficus macrophylla) east, north and north-east of the house, various mature eucalypt trees (E.spp.), a cactus hedge (Aloe arborescens & Notocactus sp.) running along Iandra Road to the east, an avenue of Persian lilac bushes (Syringa persica cv.) between the house's south-eastern wing and a side gate to Iandra Road and some shrubs near the existing and new toilet block to the house's south-west - running along the line of a former airfield in this area.

The present owner opens the homestead on designated weekends and maintain the garden beautifully. The owner cares for the garden and despite the severe drought conditions, has created a very picturesque surrounding area to complement the homestead. In spring the garden features clumps of purple iris, star-of-the veldt (Dimorphotheca / Osteospermum sp.), daffodils (Narcissus cv.s), roses (Rosa cv.s) and lemon trees (Citrus x limon)).

A large white cedar (Melia azederach var.australasica) edges the top grassed terrace before (north of) the house. Beds of roses lie between it and the lawn and house.

A scattering of pepper(corn) trees lie south-east and east of the house, concentrating into a row along Iandra Road, under which the cactus hedge (see below) is interplanted.

An orchard and shrubbery area to the house's south-east separates it from the manager's homestead. This is marked with Canary Island pine trees (Pinus canariensis), pepper(corn) trees (Schinus molle) and other shrubs and trees, including some fruit trees.

A fence was built around the grounds by Greene's son, Captain W. C. Greene.

=== Main dwelling ===
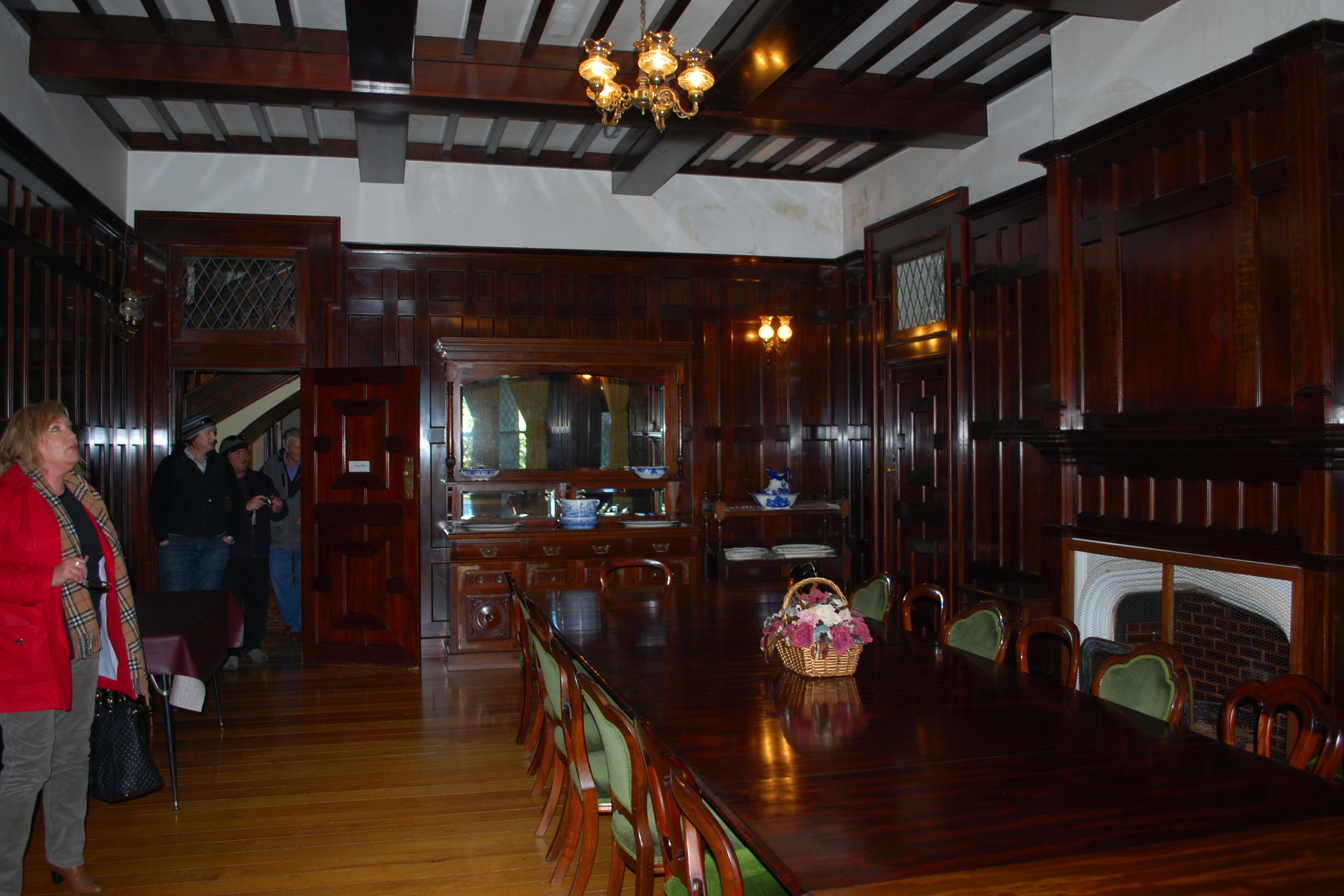
Dining room, pictured in 2011

Iandra homestead is a distinctive and idiosyncratic example of the Federation Romanesque architectural style with Tudor influences, sometimes referred to as "The Castle", reflecting its dramatic design and situation, and its feudal-like role in the history of the area and community. The Manor-like residence was designed by an unknown English architect, and is an exceptional example of reinforced concrete construction.

Built in 1908-c 1910, incorporating the earlier 1880 homestead, the manor house has a front wing of reinforced concrete, the external walls being hollow and the internal walls solid (this early use of reinforced concrete is a significant aspect of Iandra's importance). There are fifty-seven rooms and the house cost an estimated A£63,000. It is a two-storey house (plus attic) and the concrete on the exterior has been rendered to resemble sandstone. At the rear, two storey wings (with half timbering to the gables) form a courtyard. To each end of the facade are double storey bow windows with multiple small panes, and these bows are surmounted by gables.

Part of the works on Iandra were carried out/supervised by one Edward Giles Stone. Construction was completed in 1910. Stone was located at 11 Moore St, Sydney at the time. Edward Stone's father John worked on this project as well. He was located in Challis House, Sydney.

The ground floor of the facade is arcaded as is the upper floor, although the latter has flat arches and paired columns. In the centre is a portico with crenellations, above which (on the first floor) is a granite arch. Rising from this is a square tower, which has slit windows. On one corner of the top of this tower is an asymmetrically placed octagonal turret which is also crenellated. This forms a major feature of Iandra and is complemented by the numerous, tall, Medieval looking chimneys. On either side of the tower is a dormer. A crenellated parapet runs down at least one side of the house. The hipped roof is clad with asbestos cement shingles. Copper is apparently the material used for the guttering and ridge capping. On one corner of the house is another tower with a candle snuffer roof.

Iandra's interior reflects a number of Federation era or Edwardian characteristics, including large areas of timber wall panelling. The carved stairway and foyer panels are of oak, and the dining room panels are of Queensland black bean (Castanospermum australe).

Art Nouveau stained and leaded glass windows adorn every room. Each window is different and most feature a flower. These are of a very high quality and definitely by a craftsman (as yet unknown).

Early telephone and electrical systems were fitted in the house. There are the remnants of the former garden and a number of mature trees. The house is well sited and is a landmark, being visible for quite some distance.

=== Stables and electrical generating plant ===
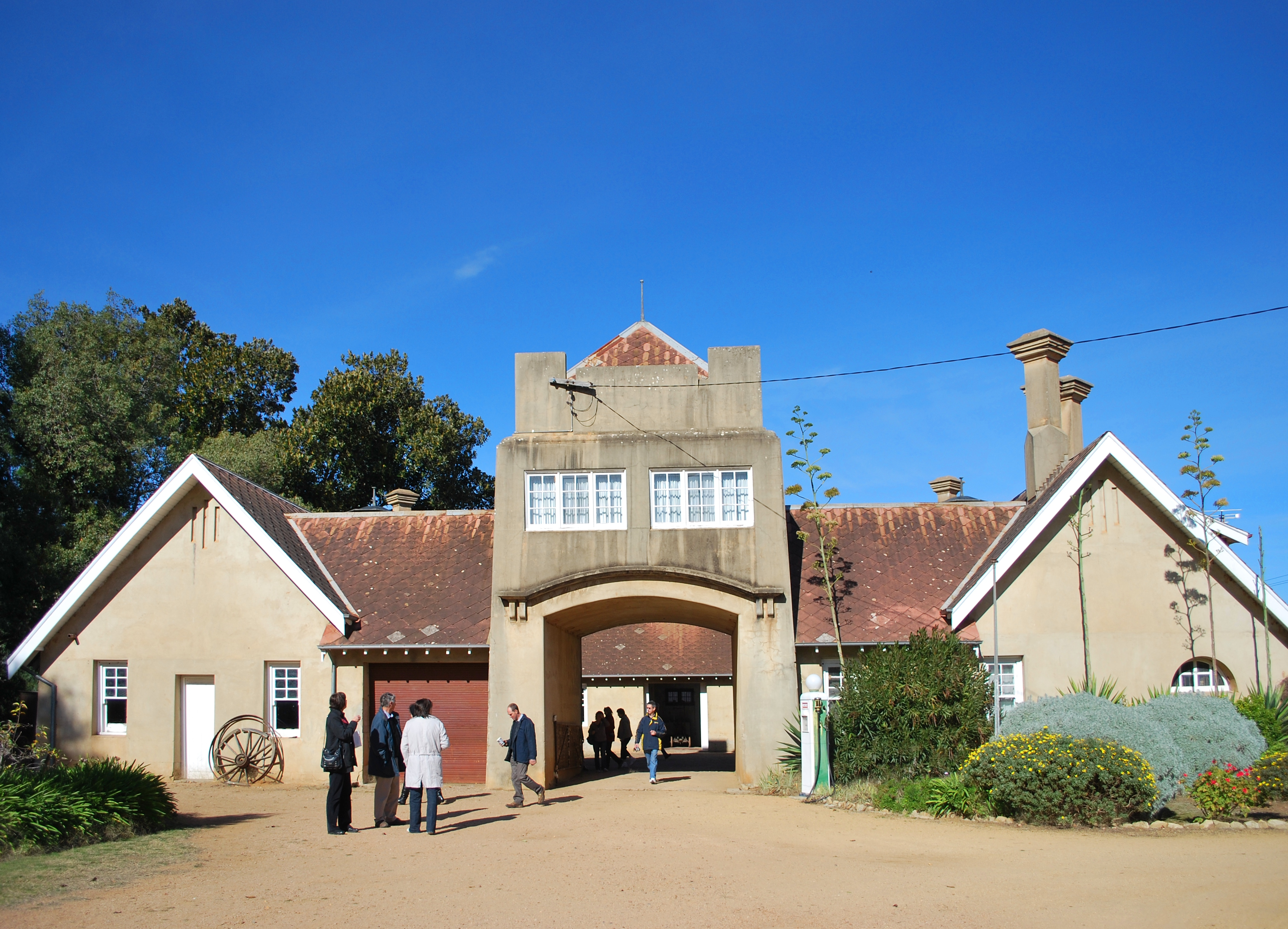
The stables, pictured in 2011.

This shares many of the characteristics of the main house. It is built (like the house) of reinforced concrete rendered to resemble sandstone. It consists of four wings forming an open courtyard in the centre. There are prominent gables at the ends of the main facade, and the roof projects beyond the wall at each of the gables and each has a group of three vertical, narrow vents or decorative recesses. Single storey, the building has attic rooms which are the workers' accommodation. Attic walls are lath and plaster.

As well as containing stables, the building also has a foaling room, garage, workshops and storerooms. The major feature is the central entranceway in the main facade. The slightly arched entrance at ground level allows access to the inner courtyard, and then above is an upper floor, boldly square in its dimensions; there is a projecting label mould just above the arch of the entrance. On the top of this upper floor is a crenellated parapet and a pyramidal roof. All the roofing is clad with asbestos cement shingles and some rafters are exposed. Fenestration is a mixture of small paned and large paned windows. Chimneys are similar to those on the house in being tall, narrow and rather Medieval in appearance.

=== Manager's residence ===
This was designed by the same architect who designed the house and it complements it well. The building is Federation Queen Anne style and is single storey (with attic rooms) and built of brick. The hipped roof has a number of protruding gables which are, characteristically for the style, half timbered; the roof extends beyond the gable ends in each case. There is also a dormer. Clad with asbestos cement shingles the roof continues, in slightly broken back form, out over the generous verandahs. As is usual for the style, the fenestration is well scaled and some windows have smaller panes to their upper sashes. Chimneys are tall and narrow.

=== Chapel and cemetery ===
The chapel further south of the homestead and yards (uphill on Iandra Road) is a reminder of the share farming activities on Iandra and the role of wealthy pastoralists in establishing churches in rural areas during the nineteenth century. Built in Gothic style in 1886 of sandstone with brick surrounds to its openings (and typically for a chapel in this style), it has a gabled, steeply pitched roof, clad in corrugated iron. Rising from one end of the roof is a fleche. There is an apse and a projecting entrance porch. Windows are pointed arch type, and there is a triple window in the apse wall.

The cemetery has several graves, including that of George Greene and, more recently, David Morris, who purchased the property c. 1975 and implemented a major restoration program.

== Condition ==
As at 24 August 2004, the buildings remain in largely original condition.

Condition of the various buildings varies but overall condition is good. The castle generally is in very good condition having benefited from many years of concentrated restoration. The main problem is water ingress through the flat roofs on the corner towers, and three chimneys have been demolished. In the stables a section of ceiling is decaying. The electrical generating plant was removed from the building long ago, however parts have since been retrieved and brought back on site. The manager's residence is sound and currently occupied. The garden/park setting is well maintained. The church walls have substantial structural cracks. The cemetery surrounds are maintained. The blacksmiths shop is in good original condition as are the hay shed and stallion shed. The accountant's and workers' cottages are in fair condition only, but are being stabilised. The water filter in the dam is sound, and the water tower is still in use. The woolshed was not assessed.

The integrity of the complex is very high, having been faithfully restored since 1974 while continuing to operate as a fully functional farm.

=== Modifications and dates ===
- 1878: 13,000-hectare (32,000-acre) estate purchased by George Greene and established as generally 260-hectare (640-acre) share-farms.
- 1880: Mt Oriel, a single storey brick home was constructed for Greene on Parish Portion 49 of 260 hectares (640 acres).
- 1895-98: Greene obtained a rail link to Grenfell
- 1908: Greene began the construction of a village at Iandra rail siding
- 1908-1910: The Castle constructed, incorporating the 1880 building. Manager's residence and stables constructed.
- 1911: 50 share farmers had been established on 7,300 hectares (18,000 acres), generally on share farms of 260 hectares (640 acres) each.
- 1911: 60 share farmers on the original 13,000 hectares (32,000 acres).
- From c. 1914: the Greene empire was broken-up for the first time and in the majority of cases the share farmers were given the option of buying the land they had been farming, generally 260-hectare (640-acre) blocks.
- 1927: Iandra and 1,000 hectares (2,500 acres) purchased by estate manager I'Anson
- 1956: homestead and 320 hectares (800 acres) transferred to the Methodist Church for use as a home for first-time male offenders, a dairy and intensive poultry programme. 490 hectares (1,200 acres) on the eastern side of the road, plus 6.9 hectares (17 acres) adjoining the homestead including the coachman's house, silo and water tank and several sheds were transferred to Keith I'Anson.
- c. 1960s: As part of the Church's use of the site for a detention home, a toilet block was constructed at the rear (west) of the main homestead, attached to a brick garden wall.
- 1974 and 1976: both parts of the estate were transferred to David Morris in a very poor state of repair. The homestead was faithfully restored by David Morris. The estate comprises 1,200 hectares (3,000 acres).
- 2007-9: grant funding (2 separate grants) to prepare a conservation management plan for the homestead, and for conservation works to the homestead and gardens, Stallion Shed, Blacksmith's Shop, Hayshed, Accountant's Cottage, Gardener's Cottage, Blade Shearing Shed.
- 2009: new toilet block erected to south-west of homestead, alongside existing toilet block.

== Heritage listing ==
The Iandra Homestead Pastoral Estate, originally established by George Henry Greene from 1878 to 1911, is of outstanding significance as arguably the largest and most progressive wheat property and wheat farming enterprise of its time in Australia. The vast estate of approximately 3,000 acres (1215 ha) comprises a magnificent Federation homestead, park-like gardens, original workers cottages, managers residence, blacksmith, chapel and cemetery, wool and hay sheds, silo, other outbuildings, associated structures, and surrounding farmland.

It was at Iandra that its owner, George Henry Greene, pioneered share-farming in 1892, which revolutionised the approach to wheat growing in Australia. Iandra was also at the forefront of wheat growing technology in the nation. The Iandra enterprise produced the largest yield of wheat at the time from a single property soon after the turn of the century. The harvest of this yield saw a concentration of labour forces of 500-600 men, a scale not previously witnessed in rural NSW.

In its scale, grandeur, planning, farmlands, gardens and collection of purpose-related buildings, the vast pastoral estate of Iandra provides valuable and rare evidence of the advancements, operation, prosperity and importance of wheat growing in Australia's development during the early 1900s.

The estate is closely associated with the life, empire and enterprises of George Henry Greene, a prominent and leading figure in rural affairs in Australia and NSW during the late 19th and early 20th centuries. Greene served terms as the MP for Grenfell, then as a Member of the Legislative Council. He also obtained the rail link for Grenfell. Greene died in 1911 and was buried at Iandra.

Iandra also represents a rare example of a complete feudal-like estate established in Australia, modelled on the English Manor system, during the Federation period, which may have no equal in NSW or Australia. All elements of the estate date from the Federation period and were constructed for the Iandra homestead owner, centred around the Iandra homestead and wheat production, including the adjoining Greenethorpe village built by Greene for his tenants. The integrity and condition of the complex as a whole is exceptionally high, which can be largely attributed to its faithful restoration by David Morris from the 1970s. The manor house itself is a landmark and remarkable example of the Federation Romanesque style illustrating the work of English architects in Australia and, together with other buildings on the estate, is an exceptional example of early reinforced concrete construction.

Iandra also remains one of few tangible places that embody the iconic, optimistic image of Australia as "the lucky country", which can still be appreciated in the surviving, grand, Edwardian estate, where a European immigrant bought undeveloped land in the middle of rural NSW, created his own replica European empire and made himself "Lord of the Manor" out of little except his own ambition, vision, enterprise, determination and the riches of the land.

Iandra Homestead Pastoral Estate was listed on the New South Wales State Heritage Register on 18 February 2005 having satisfied the following criteria.

The place is important in demonstrating the course, or pattern, of cultural or natural history in New South Wales.

The Iandra Homestead Pastoral Estate is of outstanding significance as arguably the largest and most progressive wheat property and wheat farming enterprise in Australia of its time.

It was at Iandra that the owner, George Henry Greene, pioneered share-farming, which revolutionised the approach to wheat growing in the nation. Greene introduced the innovative share-farming system in 1892 where he supplied the land and seed and the share farmer provided the labour. Amongst other technological advancements, the first large scale trial of Federation "rust proof" wheat developed by James Farrer occurred at Iandra, and Greene was the first to grow the wheat commercially.

Soon after the turn of the century, Iandra had produced the largest yield of wheat at the time from a single property (100,000 bags of wheat), and the harvest saw a concentration of labour forces of 500-600 men, a scale not previously witnessed in rural NSW.

In its scale, grandeur, planning, farmlands, gardens and collection of purpose-related buildings, the complete pastoral estate of Iandra Homestead provides valuable and rare evidence of the advancements, operation, prosperity and importance of wheat growing in Australia's development during the early 1900s.

Together with the closely associated Greenethorpe village, Iandra also represents a rare example of a complete feudal-like estate established in Australia during the Federation period, based on the English manor system. During the same period he extended Iandra homestead, Greene established and constructed Greenethorpe village in 1908 based on this English manor system, where the village was constructed to house the tenant farmers and the tenant farms were laid out based around the single manor of Iandra. The Iandra homestead and grounds, its farmland, associated residences and outbuildings, and Greenthorpe village all date from the Edwardian period and are entirely centred around a single landowner, homestead and wheat farming, the likes of which may not exist elsewhere in the state or nation.

Iandra also remains one of few tangible places that embody the iconic, optimistic image of Australia as "the lucky country", which can still be appreciated in the surviving, grand, Edwardian estate, where a European immigrant bought undeveloped land in the middle of rural NSW, created his own replica European empire and made himself "Lord of the Manor" out of little except his own ambition, vision, enterprise, determination and the riches of the land.

The place has a strong or special association with a person, or group of persons, of importance of cultural or natural history of New South Wales's history.

The entire Estate of Iandra and Greenthorpe Village are closely associated with George Henry Greene, a prominent and leading figure in rural affairs in Australia and NSW, from 1878 until his death in 1911.

Greene was a member of the Young Pastures and Stock Protection Board 1881-84, being its chairman from 1885 to 1888, and in 1890 became a foundation member of the Pastoralists Union of New South Wales. Greene was the Legislative Assembly Member for Grenfell in 1889-91, 1894 and 1895–98, during which time he was able to obtain a rail link to Grenfell. In 1899 he became a Member of the Legislative Council.

The Estate and Village demonstrate and embody the seat of his power, as well as his extraordinary accomplishments, innovation and pioneering vision for wheat farming in Australia, as he entirely masterminded the construction and innovative operation of the Estate buildings, farming practices, and layout. Greene was also responsible for the construction of the Greenethorpe Village in 1908 to house the tenants, and named after Greene.

Greene died in 1911 and was buried at the Iandra cemetery on the Estate.

The place is important in demonstrating aesthetic characteristics and/or a high degree of creative or technical achievement in New South Wales.

Iandra represents a fine and distinctive example of a magnificent Feudal-like manor house designed in the Federation Romanesque style, complete with its original grounds, farmlands, and other estate and farm buildings, all constructed in the Federation style and dating from the same period of c.1908-1911. The homestead incorporated an earlier 1880s homestead from the Victorian period.

The integrity and condition of the estate as a whole is exceptionally high.

The homestead also illustrates the work of English architects in Australia, and the work of the engineer Edward G Stone. The Manager's residence and stables constructed at the same time were also reportedly designed by the same architect, although the specific architect has still to be identified.

Commonly known as "The Castle", the homestead and Estate as a whole is also a landmark of the region, which is highly visible from its prominent situation near the crest of the hill.

The rural holdings of the Estate also represent a fine example of a complete cultural landscape of a share-farming enterprise, dating from the Federation period.

The place has strong or special association with a particular community or cultural group in New South Wales for social, cultural or spiritual reasons.

The Iandra estate is esteemed by the community of Greenethorpe and surrounding region, as the original Manor house to the village, as the landmark of the area and region, and as the place from where the village and prosperity of the region directly originated, and which it continues to represent. As such, the estate is of considerable importance to the community sense of place at Greenethorpe.

This item was identified in two community workshops for the Central West project held at Forbes and Lithgow to identify items of significance to the people of NSW, which is a further indicator of the esteem in which the property is held by the broader contemporary community.

The place has potential to yield information that will contribute to an understanding of the cultural or natural history of New South Wales.

The complete estate is an important historic reference site of the highly successful wheat farming properties and operations in Australia from the Federation period.

It also has potential to yield rare information of the adaptation of the English Manor Feudal-like system in Australia.

The homestead, together with other buildings within the estate are also exceptional examples of the early use of reinforced concrete construction.

The place possesses uncommon, rare or endangered aspects of the cultural or natural history of New South Wales.

The Iandra Homestead Pastoral Estate is rare in Australia as the largest and most progressive wheat property and wheat farming enterprise in Australia of its time, which has survived with a remarkably high degree of integrity.

It is also a rare as the first example of the innovative and highly successful share-farming system in Australia, dating from 1892.

Iandra, and the closely associated Greenethorpe village, are a rare example of a complete feudal-like estate established in Australia during the Federation period, based on the English manor system. The homestead and grounds, its farmland, associated residences and outbuildings, and Greenthorpe village all date from the Edwardian period and are entirely centred around a single landowner, homestead and wheat farming, the likes of which may not exist elsewhere in the state or nation.

In its distinctive scale, grandeur, planning, farmlands, gardens and collection of purpose-related buildings, the complete pastoral estate of Iandra Homestead provide rare evidence of the advancements, operation, prosperity and importance of wheat growing in Australia's development during the early 1900s.

The place is important in demonstrating the principal characteristics of a class of cultural or natural places/environments in New South Wales.

The Iandra Homestead Pastoral Estate represents an outstanding example of a vast wheat farming estate from the Federation period, complete with its original farmland, manor house, park-like gardens, Estate and farm buildings.

The buildings represent fine and distinctive examples of the Federation style of architecture in rural NSW.

In its entirety, the item represents an excellent example of a wheat farming cultural landscape that is distinctly associated with the pioneering of share-farming practices in Australia, as well as with the establishment of a complete Feudal-like estate and English Manor system in Australia.
