= Clare Hunt =

Australian soccer player

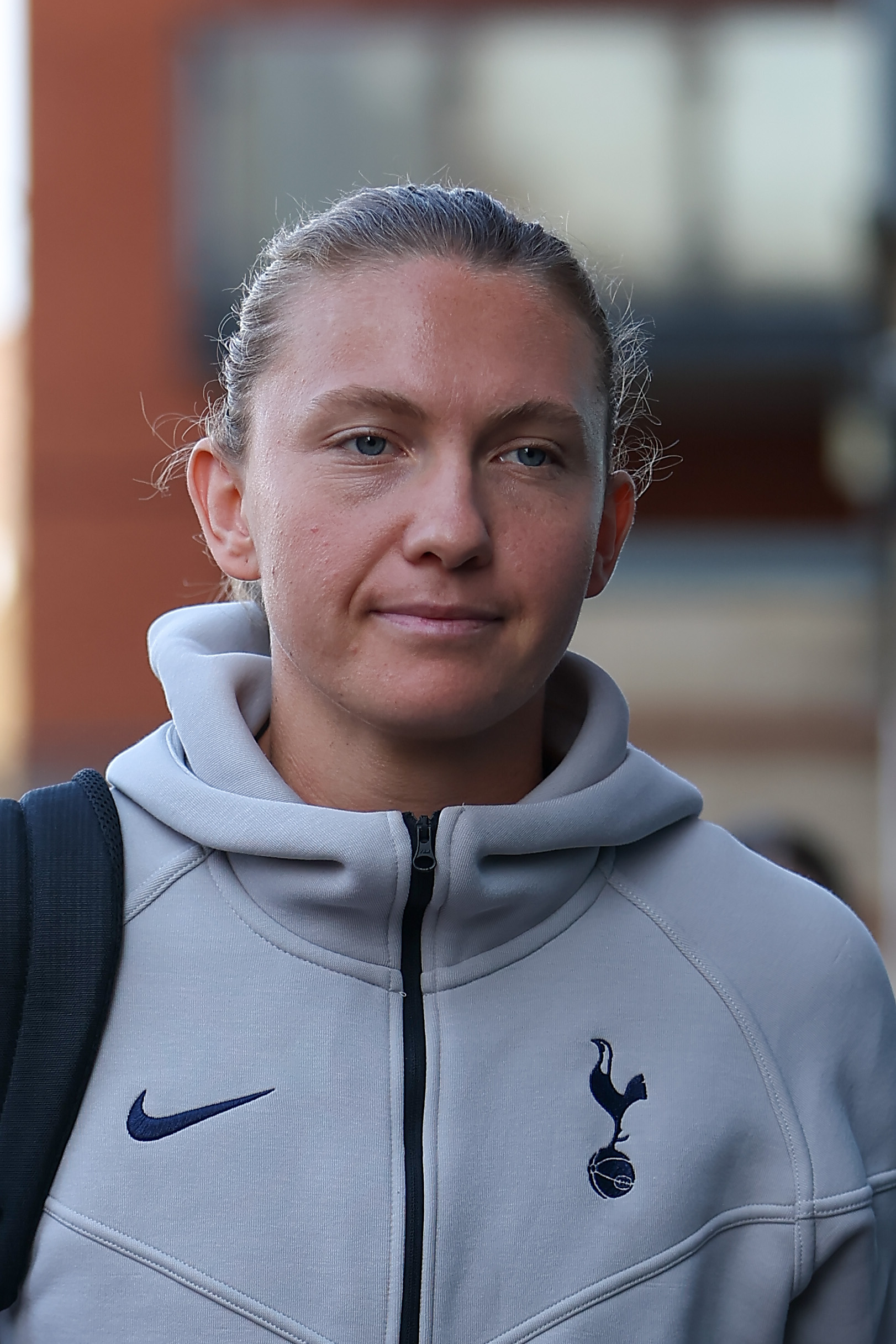
- Hunt in 2025

Personal information
- Full name: Clare Josephine Hunt
- Date of birth: 12 March 1999 (age 27)
- Place of birth: Grenfell, New South Wales, Australia
- Height: 1.76 m (5 ft 9 in)
- Position: Centre-back

Team information
- Current team: Tottenham Hotspur
- Number: 15

Youth career
- Grenfell JSC
- Canberra United

Senior career*
Years	Team	Apps	(Gls)
2016–2021	Canberra United	12	(0)
2021–2023	Western Sydney Wanderers	25	(1)
2023–2024	Paris Saint-Germain	13	(0)
2024–	Tottenham Hotspur	33	(2)

International career^{‡}
2023–	Australia	45	(1)
- * Club domestic league appearances and goals as of 15:13, 17 May 2026 (UTC) ‡ National team caps and goals as of 15:13, 17 May 2026 (UTC)

Clare Josephine Hunt (born 12 March 1999) is an Australian professional soccer player who plays as a centre-back for Women's Super League club Tottenham Hotspur and the Australia national team. She previously played for A-League Women clubs Canberra United and Western Sydney Wanderers (where she served as the club captain) and for Première Ligue club Paris Saint-Germain.

== Early life ==
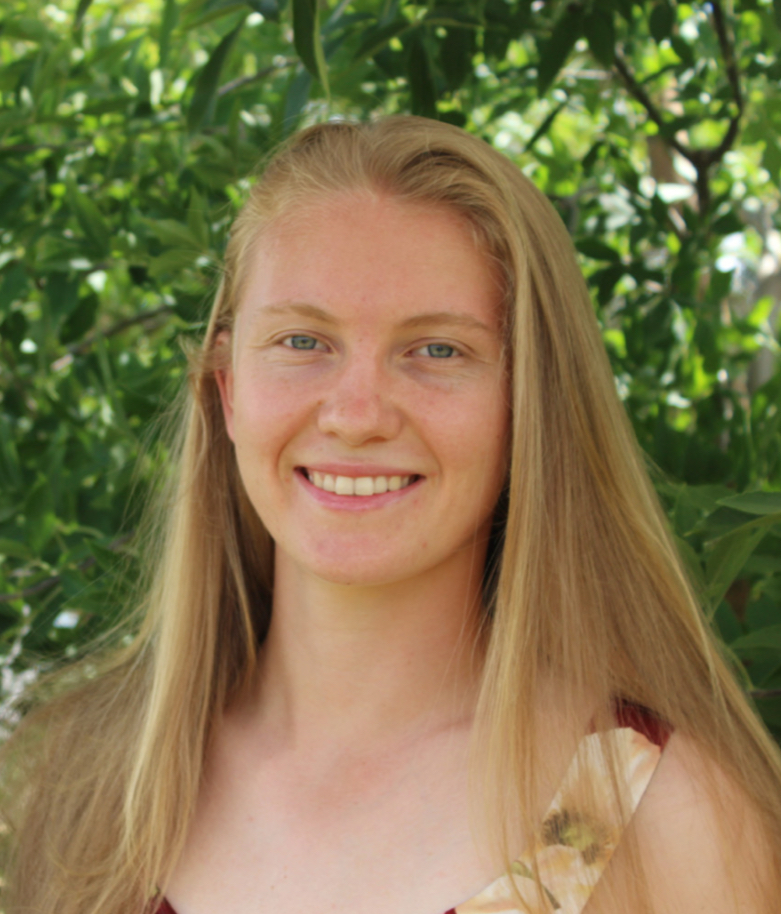
Hunt in 2017

Clare Hunt grew up in the rural town of Grenfell, New South Wales. She joined the Canberra United Academy at 15. Her older brother, Henry, plays for the South Australia cricket team and her younger sister, Anna, has represented the Matildas at a junior level.

Hunt attended Henry Lawson High School in Grenfell.

== Club career ==
=== Canberra United ===
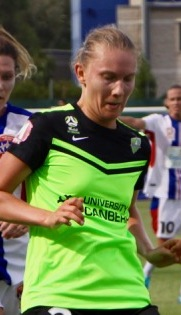
Hunt playing for Canberra United in 2018.

Hunt joined Canberra United from Canberra Croatia in October 2016. In November 2016, Hunt made her debut for the club in a 5–2 win against Newcastle Jets, coming off the bench in the 59th minute.

=== Western Sydney Wanderers ===
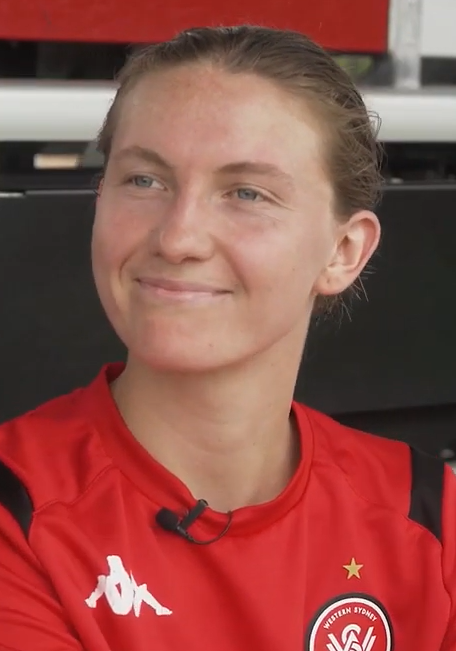
Hunt with Western Sydney Wanderers in 2023.

Hunt signed a contract Western Sydney Wanderers in September 2021. In December 2021, Hunt made her debut for A-League Women club Western Sydney Wanderers in a 0–0 draw with Wellington Phoenix.

=== Paris Saint-Germain ===
On 15 September 2023, Hunt joined French club Paris Saint-Germain for an undisclosed fee, signing a three-year contract.

=== Tottenham Hotspur ===
On 16 August 2024, Hunt joined WSL club Tottenham Hotspur on a three-year contract.

Hunt scored her first goal for Tottenham in a 3–2 loss at home to Liverpool on 6 October 2024. Her second goal for Tottenham also came against Liverpool on 28 April 2025 in a 2–2 draw away.

== International career ==
Hunt made her debut for the Australia national team on 16 February 2023 in a 4–0 win over Czech Republic in the Cup of Nations, where she came on as a second-half substitute for Aivi Luik. She was also used in two other games in the tournament, as well as two other friendlies in April.

On 3 July 2023, Hunt was selected for the 2023 World Cup squad.

On 4 June 2024, Hunt was named in the Matildas team which qualified for the Paris 2024 Olympics, her debut Olympics selection. Later that year, she scored her debut goal for Australia in a 1–2 win against Germany on 28 October in Duisburg, Germany.

In March 2026, Hunt was part of the Matildas team which finished as runners-up in the 2026 AFC Women's Asian Cup, where she started in 4 out of the 5 matches played by the Matildas and sustained an injury to her right knee which required her to undergo surgery.

== Personal life ==
Hunt's best friend is Australia national team teammate Clare Wheeler (a defensive midfielder for Everton), with both being alumnae of St Andrew's College at the University of Sydney and their close bond having remained ever since. At her club Tottenham Hotspur, she is also close friends with Japanese fellow centre back Tōko Koga and Dutch goalkeeper Lize Kop. Upon arriving at Tottenham, Koga received assistance from Hunt in settling in and improving her English skills (partially inspired by her own struggles communicating during her time at Paris Saint-Germain (PSG) due to her inability to speak French), and the pair subsequently swapped jerseys following the 2026 AFC Women's Asian Cup final in Sydney, in which Japan defeated Australia 1–0.

== Career statistics ==
=== Club ===
As of match played 16 May 2026

Appearances and goals by club, season and competition
Club	Season	League			National cup (Note: Includes Coupe de France Féminine, Women's FA Cup)		League cup (Note: Includes Women's League Cup)		Continental (Note: Includes UEFA Women's Champions League)		Total	
Club	Season	Division	Apps	Goals	Apps	Goals	Apps	Goals	Apps	Goals	Apps	Goals
Canberra United	2016–17	A-League	4	0	—		—		—		4	0
Canberra United	2017–18	A-League	7	0	—		—		—		7	0
Canberra United	2020–21	A-League	1	0	—		—		—		1	0
Canberra United	Total		12	0	0	0	0	0	0	0	12	0
Western Sydney Wanderers	2021–22	A-League	8	0	—		—		—		8	0
Western Sydney Wanderers	2022–23	A-League	17	1	—		—		—		17	1
Western Sydney Wanderers	Total		25	1	0	0	0	0	0	0	25	1
Paris Saint-Germain	2023–24	Première Ligue	13	0	1	0	—		8	0	22	0
Tottenham Hotspur	2024–25	Women's Super League	17	2	1	0	3	0	—		21	2
Tottenham Hotspur	2025–26	Women's Super League	16	0	1	0	4	0	—		21	0
Tottenham Hotspur	Total		33	2	2	0	7	0	0	0	42	2
Career total			83	3	3	0	7	0	8	0	101	3

=== International ===
As of match played 21 March 2026

Appearances and goals by national team and year
National team	Year	Apps	Goals
Australia	2023	14	0
Australia	2024	15	1
Australia	2025	11	0
Australia	2026	5	0
Total		45	1

Scores and results list Australia's goal tally first, score column indicates score after each Hunt goal.

List of international goals scored by Clare Hunt
No.	Date	Venue	Opponent	Score	Result	Competition
1	28 October 2024	Schauinsland-Reisen-Arena, Duisburg, Germany	Germany	2–1	2–1	Friendly

== Honours ==
Paris Saint-Germain

- Coupe de France: 2023–24
