= Heesco =

Mongolian-Australian street artist

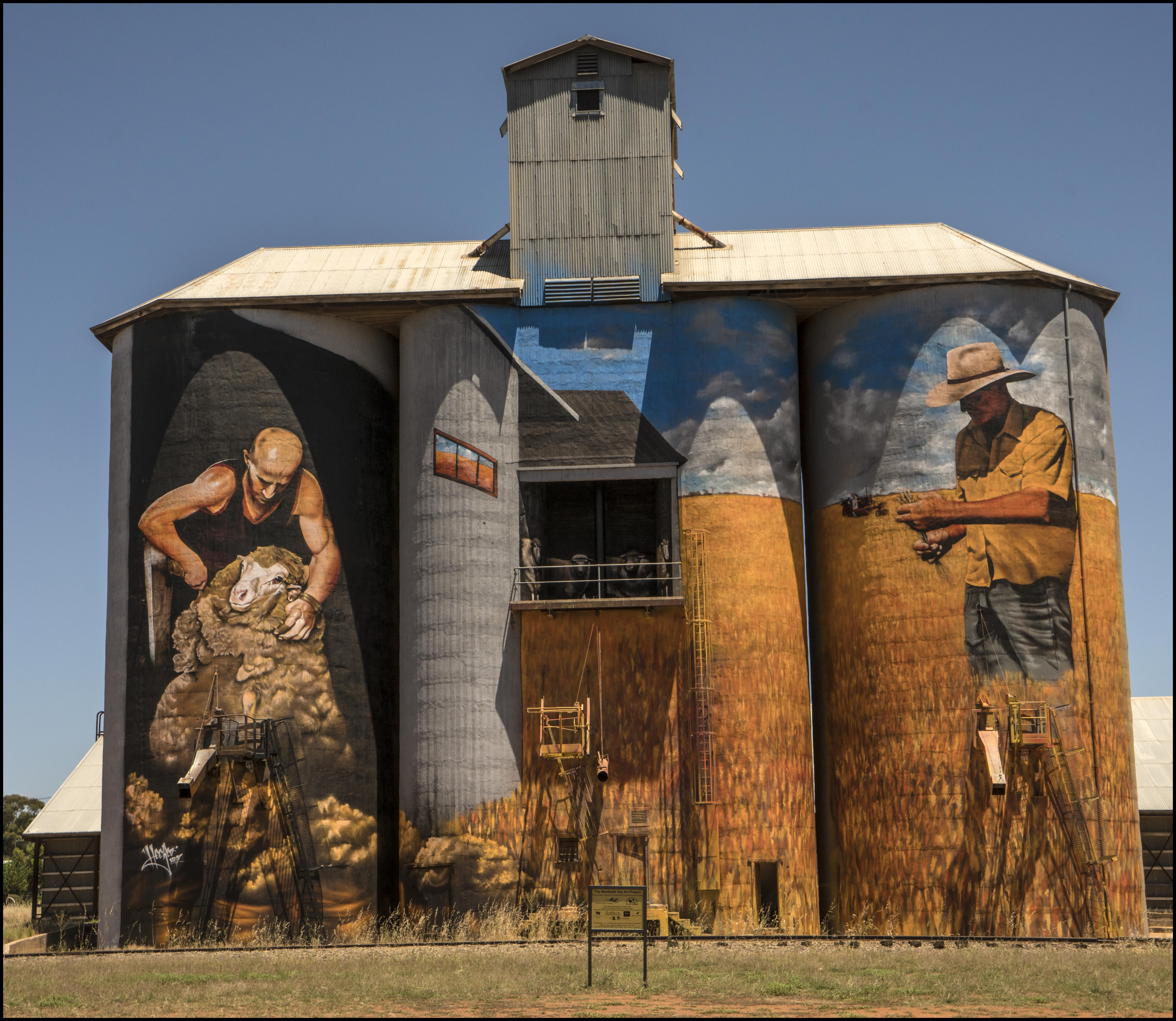
- 2017 mural by Heesco at Weethalle, New South Wales
- Born: Khosnaran Khurelbaatar; 1979 (age 45–46); Ulaanbaatar, Mongolian People's Republic
- Style: Muralism
- Movement: Graffiti
- Website: heesco.com

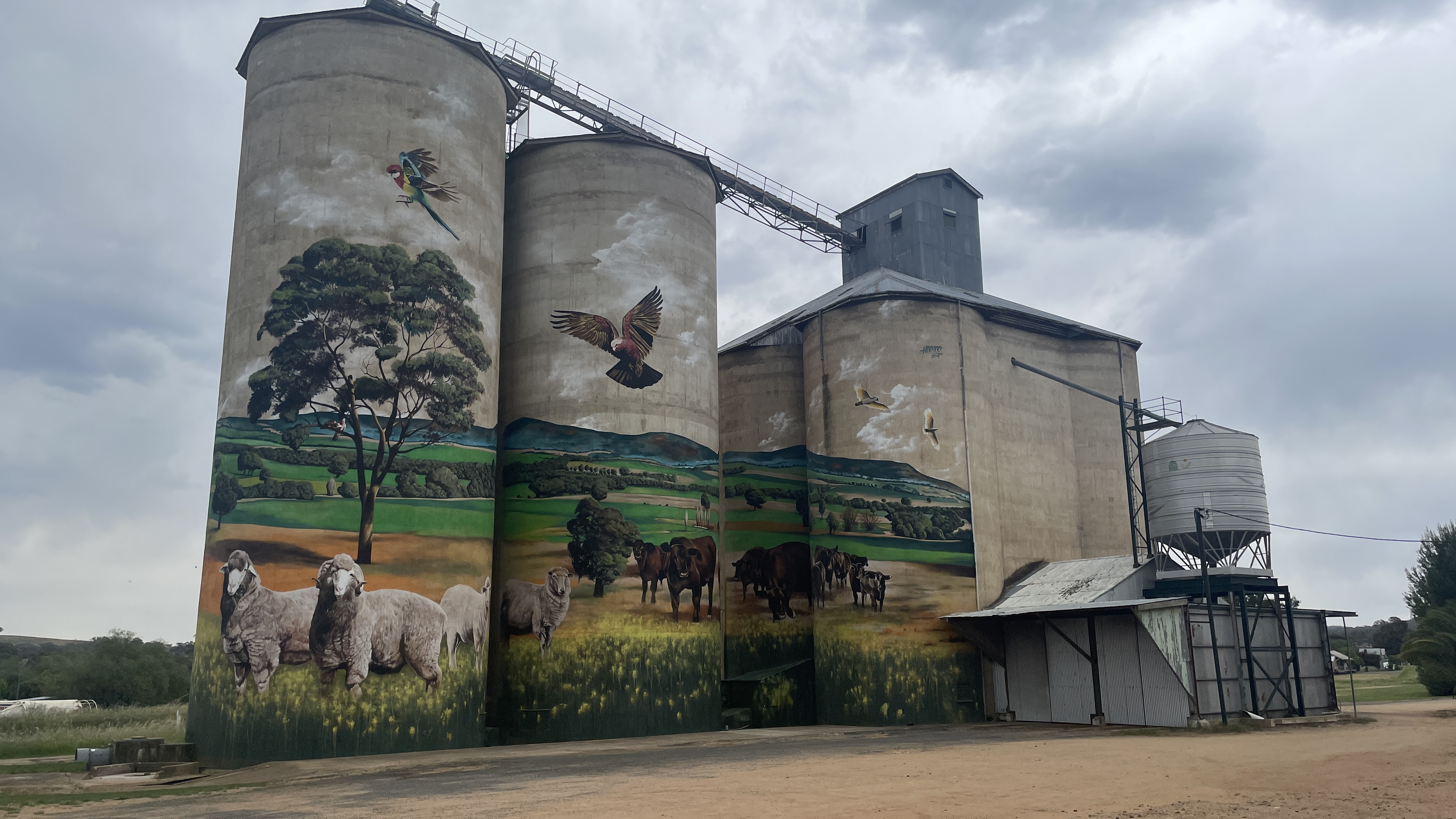
2019 mural Heesco at Grenfell, New South Wales

Heesco is the tag of the artist Khosnaran Khurelbaatar (Mongolian: Хүрэлбаатарын Хоснаран), who is mostly known for his large scale murals and silo art. Heesco also actively makes fine art, illustration and graphic design related works. Heesco lives and works in Melbourne, Australia.

== Biography ==
Originally from Ulaanbaatar, Mongolia, Heesco moved to Australia in 1999 and has painted various artworks across Australia, including a massive mural depicting a woman in traditional Mongolian dress at the Victoria University campus in Footscray, winning the Footscray Art Prize for Street Art.

Heesco Town – A small town called Yarram in Gippsland, Australia, invited Heesco to take on a project to paint 10 murals during 2020, which later expanded into 24 murals the following year, and gained national and international attention during the COVID-19 pandemic. The murals depict local identities and their stories including the story of Chin Lang Tip – a Mongolian man who lived in the area in 1860's, and reportedly had 2 wives and fathered 17 children. Four of his sons enlisted during World War 1 as part of the Australian Light Horse Regiment and fought in the Battle of Beersheba. All four would return home safe.

In June 2020, the Governor of Victoria invited Heesco to create an artwork to express the gratitude of Victorians towards the frontline workers who battled the recent catastrophic bushfires and the COVID-19 global pandemic.

Heesco is involved with number of non-profit and charity organisations in Mongolia, and is an ambassador of the Lantuun Dohio NGO who work extensively in the field of child protection services and are dedicated to fighting human trafficking in Mongolia and overseas. In 2020 Heesco helped set up Lantuun Dohio Australia, and currently serves as the President of the organisation.
