= Greenethorpe =

Greenethorpe New South Wales
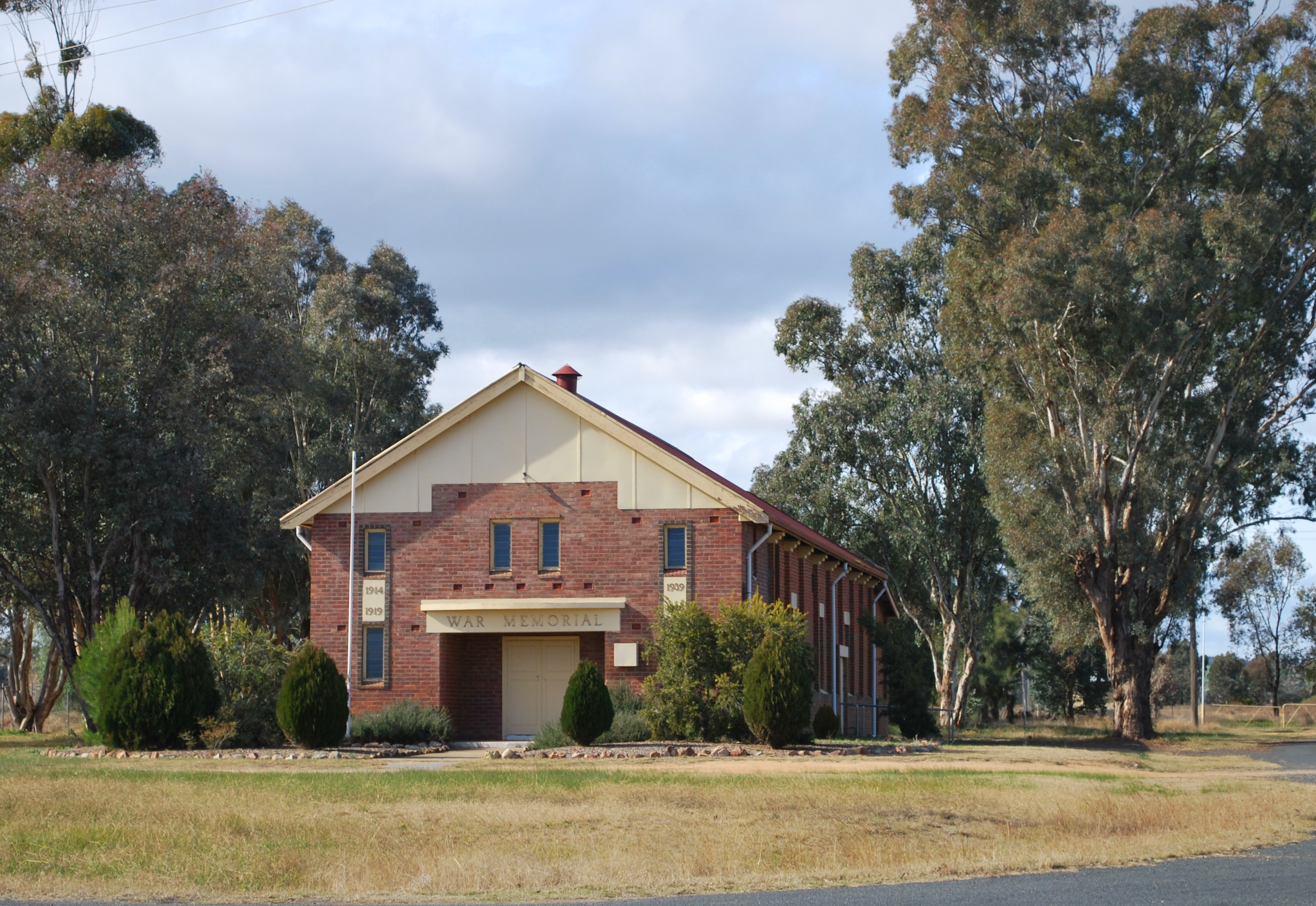
- War memorial hall

- Coordinates: 33°59′47″S 148°24′09″E
- Population: 202 (SAL 2021)
- Established: 1908
- Postcode(s): 2809
- Location: 345 km (214 mi) W of Sydney; 128 km (80 mi) SW of Orange; 37 km (23 mi) SW of Cowra; 31 km (19 mi) E of Grenfell
- LGA(s): Weddin Shire
- State electorate(s): Cootamundra
- Federal division(s): Riverina

Greenethorpe is a town in the Central West region of New South Wales, Australia. The town is located in the Weddin Shire local government area, 345 kilometres (214 mi) west of the state capital, Sydney. At the 2011 census, Greenethorpe and the surrounding area had a population of 320.

The village, with the associated "Mount Oriel" homestead (known locally as Iandra Castle), is a rare example in Australia of the manorial system, "the likes of which may not exist elsewhere in the state or nation".

== History ==
Greenethorpe is a purpose-built town, established in 1908 to house sharefarmers who worked on Iandra, the nearby pastoral station owned by George Henry Greene. The village, built adjacent to a rail siding on the Grenfell railway line, was originally named Iandra Siding but to avoid confusion between the pastoral station and the train station, the Post Office agreed to change the name to Greenthorpe. Shortly after, the spelling was again changed, this time to Greenethorpe from the Greene family name. Greenethorpe Public School was first established in 1903 as a Provisional School and named Iandra Siding. The school was renamed in 1909.

Iandra Siding Post Office opened on 20 January 1908 and was renamed Greenethorpe in September that year.

The village itself was based on the English manorial system, with tenant farms—generally 640 acres (260 ha) each—distributed around the central homestead. The sharefarming system began in 1892 and a rail siding constructed in 1903. In the early years of the twentieth century, Iandra set a record for the largest ever yield of wheat from a single property, and by 1911 there were fifty sharefarmers working over 18,000 acres (7,300 ha) there—the farmers supplying the machinery and labour and Greene providing seed and clearing ground suitable for ploughing. Around 1914, the property began to be broken up and most tenants were offered an option to purchase the land they had farmed.

The main dwelling in the Iandra homestead is an ornate mansion built from reinforced concrete in the Federation Romanesque style with Tudor influences. Consisting of 57 rooms on two storeys, it is referred to locally as "The Castle" in reference to its striking design and its semi-feudal role in the community. The homestead, built by pioneering engineer, Edward Giles Stone, also includes a blacksmith, manager's residence, stables, and a small Gothic chapel.

== Heritage listings ==
Greenethorpe has a number of heritage-listed sites, including:

- Iandra Road: Iandra Castle

== Today ==
Facilities in the town include a Post Office General Store, a hotel - The Shamrock, a Public School and a Police Station. There is also a Cafe and Bed & Breakfast - CIRCA 1935 located in the heritage listed former Bank of NSW Building. The town has an art gallery - Blue Sky, the owner of which also manufactures gypsy caravans and tiny homes. The town does not have a mail delivery service; mail must be collected from the post office. Greenethorpe Public School still uses the existing 1903 building for two classrooms, a library and a computer laboratory with the art room, kitchen and the administration located in adjacent buildings. The school is fully air-conditioned.

The Soldiers Memorial Hall is the centrepiece of the village and is currently undergoing restoration and upgrading of the building and grounds. The building houses photographs and information relating to locals who served in WW1 and WW2. It is used for social events such as dances, concerts, school functions, yoga classes, and is also available for hire at a nominal fee, for private functions. A recent addition is a separate building to house the Greenethorpe History Group and its collection. An external War Memorial is planned for 2021.

There is no longer a rail service to Greenethorpe, this having terminated in 2009. Both Local and State governments have been extensively lobbied to reopen the service for grain transport and tourism, however to date this has not been successful.
