= Edward Giles Stone =

Australian engineer (1873–1947)

Edward Giles Stone (17 February 1876 – 16 October 1947) was an Australian engineer prominent in many innovative, often daringly spectacular, aspects of early reinforced concrete constructions in Australia. He was also involved in cement manufacture. He was briefly a pioneer in prefab housing but that industry was destined to use timber, not concrete plates.

== Early life ==
Stone was born in Sydney, the son of John Jasper Stone, Civil Engineer, and Caroline Smith. He served a 'cadetship' with his father, then worked for the Roads and Bridges Branch of the Public Works Department for about seven years, after which he joined the Sewerage Construction Department. Three years later, in 1900, he joined the newly formed Sydney Harbour Trust as Chief Design Engineer. In 1907 he entered private practice as 'Consulting Engineer and Structural Architect, specialising in Reinforced Concrete'. It is of interest that Stone was working for the Road and Bridges Branch at the same time that former members of the branch were building the first reinforced concrete structures in Australia.

In 1909, Stone applied for a patent for 'improvements relating to storage chambers' such as silos, using precast concrete plates with integral edge beams, these edges being formed with flanges and gussets to assist in their assembly. Stone set up a precasting plant in Emu Plains NSW, for the manufacture of reinforced concrete houses, silos, water troughs, bins and other products. The system he developed was used for the construction of a five-roomed cottage (heritage listed but since then demolished) at 2 Railway Street, Emu Plains, and for a large house of two storeys in Iandra (7 Windermere Avenue, Northmead) for George Henry Greene, member of the Legislative Council of New South Wales (listed on the Baulkham Hills LEP). Stone also built other houses and silos. On Greene's property, he also built a stable and a motor garage, a large silo surmounted by a water tank, and single-storey bachelor's quarters, completed in 1910 and known locally as Iandra Castle.

== Stone and Siddeley ==
In 1912 Stone entered a partnership with Ernest J. Siddeley, in which Stone was the driving design force while Siddeley was the project manager who executed the works. Edward Giles Stone adopted the Considère system for reinforcing concrete and the partnership produced some remarkable buildings and structures using this system, notably the Dennys Lascelles Austin wool store at Geelong, the Barwon Sewerage Aqueduct, Floating Pontoons at Circular Quay and the Breakwater at Glenelg. Stone and his partner Siddeley designed and constructed the concrete structures on the Mortlake Gas Works in Sydney including the coal and coke bunkers, the tunnel to take the Telpher system under the retorts, as well as the Power House.

Stone is seen as an important early user of reinforced concrete of interest due to his use of the Considère system. Elements of the Considère system, notably the helical wrapping later became accepted reinforcing practice but at the time of Stone was working, the approach was novel.

Lewis considers "the most innovative form of reinforcement used in Australia was that of the Frenchman Armand-Gabriel Considère". The Considère system worked on the basic principle of the reinforcement of compression members with heavy spiral reinforcing bars, much heavier than would be necessary for a simple ligature. Considère's compression members were usually circular or polygonal in section, and he introduced spiral winding in other zones of compression, such as the haunches of beams, where they were angled up on the slope.

The development of reinforced concrete and its application in Australia has been discussed by various authors. Of the various patented systems, the Monier system was implemented in NSW by Carter, Gummow & Co from 1895 followed by its implementation in Victoria by Monash and Anderson from 1905 (see Sir John Monash. Miles Lewis has noted "The reason why few engineers were active is that the technology was riddled with patents, and that the Monier company in particular tried to give the impression that they had the sole rights to reinforced concrete.

However, Stone was not merely important because of his application of a reinforcing system in Australia. From some of his known works, Stone was an innovative and daring designer of concrete structures. The partnership of Stone and Siddeley was an important rival to the practice of Monash and Anderson. Opinions seem to vary as to the cause of the practice's demise. The breakwater at Glenelg was never completed and there was a dispute with the South Australian government. Stone had some unfortunate associations with cement production in Tasmania (possibly at the Goliath works) and at Port Kembla.

== Early designs in reinforced concrete ==
It is interesting, when comparing Edward Giles Stone's work with that of his contemporaries such as John Monash and others, that Stone combined the innovation of reinforced concrete with some spectacular designs of which the Dennys Lascelles Austin wool store, and the Barwon Sewer Auqeduct, seem to have been the most prominent.

The status of these two works attests to Stone's prominence as an innovative designer of reinforced concrete structures being at the time (early 20th century) one of the leading designers in the world working in reinforced concrete (but probably he wasn't known outside Australia).

Edward Giles Stone's legacy can be seen through the heritage listing of two of his greatest works.

=== The Barwon Sewer Aqueduct ===
The aqueduct was built between 1913 and 1915. It is a reinforced concrete truss structure, in a form derived from the Firth of Forth rail bridge in Scotland, with a typical span of 53.7m and an overall length of 756m. Both the maximum span and the overall length are far in excess of any other Australian reinforced concrete structure of the time). The truss form is most unusual in concrete, very few being built anywhere in the world. The structure is significant at the National level as an early, unique and innovative use of reinforced concrete. The structure which has remarkable aesthetic and technical qualities is dramatically situated in the landscape of the Barwon River floodplain near Breakwater, Geelong. The site is included on the Victorian Heritage Register (VHR Number: H0895) and the Register of National Estate (RNE 16061) See also the non-statutory National Trust of Australia (Victoria) Register (B5779)

In 2004, the Aqueduct was nominated to the National Heritage List. Following assessment by the Australian Heritage Council the nomination was not adopted by the Minister. Barwon Water has applied to Heritage Victoria for a permit to remove four of the 14 spans of the heritage-listed Ovoid Sewer Aqueduct, as these had been rapidly deteriorating in condition since the 1970s ( www.heritage.vic.gov.au/permits/currently-advertised-permits ). In considering the Aqueduct's future, Barwon Water has investigated options for ensuring public safety and improving public access to the Barwon River and the surrounding land; as well as attempting to balance heritage values with the management of costs for customers".

=== The former Dennys Lascelles Austin Concrete Woolstore ===
This was a series of buildings in Geelong built in stages from 1872. The final major extension to the buildings was the so-called Bow String Truss building, which was started in 1910. The architect and engineer was Edward Giles Stone. The builder of the concrete woolstore was J C Taylor and Sons although much of the construction was by day labour. The building was a very early and innovative use of reinforced concrete. Of particular note are the daringly large trusses on the top floor, which provided a clear space of 55m x 52m, an important consideration for the Dennys' style of selling wool at the place of storage and display. Not only was this by a very big margin the largest reinforced concrete roof span in the world, but also it was assembled with enormous ingenuity. The great span was achieved by adopting the principles of bridge design, and in fact copying the form of a major bridge at Plougastel in Brittany designed by Considère in his position at the Ponts et Chaussées. The trusses were, in fact, paired with the sawtooth roof passing through them. They followed the Considère patent in form and method of reinforcing. The precast panels of the roof were also notable. (Their 1915 US Patent Application "Process of molding plastics" provides an insight into how they achieved such high quality precast panels.)

The site is registered on the Victorian Heritage Register (VHR Number: H0587) and was included on the Register of The National Estate (RNE 19070).
See also the non-statutory National Trust of Australia (Victoria) Register (B4710)

The building was nominated for world heritage listing due to its exceptional characteristics relating to the pioneering use of reinforced concrete. The world heritage nomination had been supported by international referees who had assessed the application. Unfortunately this building was demolished, in controversial circumstances, in 1990.

== The 1917 Coastal Traders Proposal ==
"The Argus" of Friday 8 June 1917 p6 reports a proposal of Stone's to construct a fleet of concrete ships. The paper reported "Mr. E. G. Stone, of Messrs. Stone and Siddeley, engineers and contractors, has put before the Prime Minister a proposal to construct a 4,000 ton concrete vessel within seven months, and after that, if the work is organised on a large enough scale, to maintain an output of one similar vessel a week"

"The vessels would be built of concrete, with a framework of steel bars, which can easily be obtained. Messrs. Thompson Brothers, of Castlemaine, and other engineering firms have offered to supply the necessary engines within the specified time. They will be internal combustion engines, of the semi- Diesel type, and the vessels will be capable of a speed of 10 knots an hour. A greater speed could be attained, but it would not justify the expense. The vessels will be purely cargo-carriers, of course. My firm has offered to back my opinion that the vessels will be seaworthy and satisfactory, by a guarantee of £10,000, and Messrs Thompson Brothers will back their engines"

There is no evidence that any of these proposed vessels were constructed.

== Stone and Tasmanian Cement ==
Stone was one of the founders of Tasmanian Cement Pty Ltd in 1922. The initial plant was to be near Hobart but Stone became interested in the Railton site because of nearby oil shale. He formulated an invention to use the exhaust gases from the cement kiln to distil oil from the oil shale. Erection of plant began in late 1923 or early 1924.

Stone was the managing director but without salary. He received shares for his part in founding the company and assignment of his inventions and patents. The company was short of money in 1924 and persuaded Dorman, Long & Company (who had secured the contract to build the Sydney Harbour Bridge to take up shares in the venture. In 1925 the company was still short of money and the president (Sir Hugh Bell) of Dorman, Long visited Tasmania and Dorman, Long again agreed to put in money but on condition they took over management. Stone was asked to resign as managing director. The board (including L Ennis of Dorman, Long) then decided to sack Stone as construction engineer.

It was evident that Stone's oil shale plant did not work. The cement plant was changed from oil firing to pulverised coal firing. The first cement was produced in 1926 and supplied to Hume Pipe Company of Melbourne.

The company was reformed in July 1928 as Goliath Portland Cement with 5 directors including one from Dorman, Long (L Ennis) and one from Hume Pipe Company (T S Nettlefold). The company still operates today. Because of the problems with Stone's technology and Tasmanian Cement Pty. Ltd, Dorman, Long had to buy their cement from Kandos for the harbour bridge.

Another cement works associated with E.G. Stone is the "Never Been Beaten Lime & Cement Works" at Deep Creek, Narrabeen Lagoon, on the Northern Beaches of Sydney, which may have operated c1941-1955. Further research into these works is on-going, and Council has been asked to help protect segment of a rotary cement clinker kiln which Stone is believed to have brought there from his failed cement works near Port Kembla.

== Chronology of the works of Edward Giles Stone ==
- 1906 Fibro-Cement Silo, Werrington, NSW.
- 1908–1910 Australian Patents for the construction of Concrete Silos
- 1908-c1910 Iandra Homestead and associated buildings, Iandra Road, Greenethorpe, New South Wales
- 1909 Cottage (with Precast Slabs), 2 Railway Street, Emu Plains, New South Wales.
- 1910–1911 James Minifie and Company silos, Lennon Street, Kensington, Melbourne.
- 1910–1911 Burrows Hume Flour Mill,Young Street crnr Wilson Street, Albury, NSW.
- 1911–1912 Dennys Lascelles Austin Concrete Woolstore, Geelong.
- 1914–1915 Sewerage Aqueduct over Barwon River, Geelong. Australia's most unusual concrete bridge.
- c1914 The ribbed concrete ventilation stack at the ocean outfall at Black Rock, Connewarre (near Geelong)
- c1914 Reinforced Concrete floating pontoons ".. 180ft. long with a beam of 80ft... in Sydney Harbour". Believed to be the largest floating pontoons in the world at the time.
- 1915 Retaining Wall Corio Bay, Geelong. 950 ft.
  - Silos at Moolap, Geelong for the Cheetham Salt Co
  - The Cadbury Complex near Hobart
  - Light tower on Shark Island, Sydney
  - A four-storey factory in Melbourne
  - A nine-storey factory in Sydney
  - Ore bins at the Broken Hill South mine,
- 1915 Glenelg Breakwater, South Australia. Contracted 1915 Begun 1916, unable to be completed because of bad weather. Contract suspended to enable efforts to be concentrated on building boats, during World War 1. Never completed.
- 1915 Cape Thevenard Jetty, South Australia. Contracted 1915. Begun 1916. Contract suspended to enable efforts to be concentrated on building boats, during World War 1. When completed in 1919 it was believed to be the first concrete jetty in the world at the time.
- 1915 Process of Molding Plastics. USA Patent Application 1212838 A
- 1917 Concrete Ships Proposal. Proposal put to the Prime Minister during World War 1.
- 1918 Gave evidence on building concrete silos, South Australia.
- c1920 Coal Wharf, Port Adelaide, South Australia.
- 1920 Precast Concrete
- 1922 Rotary Kiln. USA Patent Application 1550591 A
- 1923 Launceston Railway Workshops – Main Building, Inveresk, Tasmanaia. The railway workshops is one of Tasmania's most intact nineteenth century industrial environments. It has been adapted and conserved as the Queen Victoria Museum and Art Gallery at Inveresk. The Main Building is named the Stone Building after Edward Giles Stone.
- 1924 Retort. USA Patent Application 1540662 A
- 1925 Edward Giles Stone resigned from appointment as Manager of Tasmanian Cement Company.
- 1925 Retort. USA Patent Application 1549623 A
- 1925 Precast Tilt Slabs and Panels. Article in Australian Home Beautiful.
- 1929 Ball or Tube Mill. USA Patent Application 1794041 A
