= Grenfell, New South Wales =

Grenfell
- Town
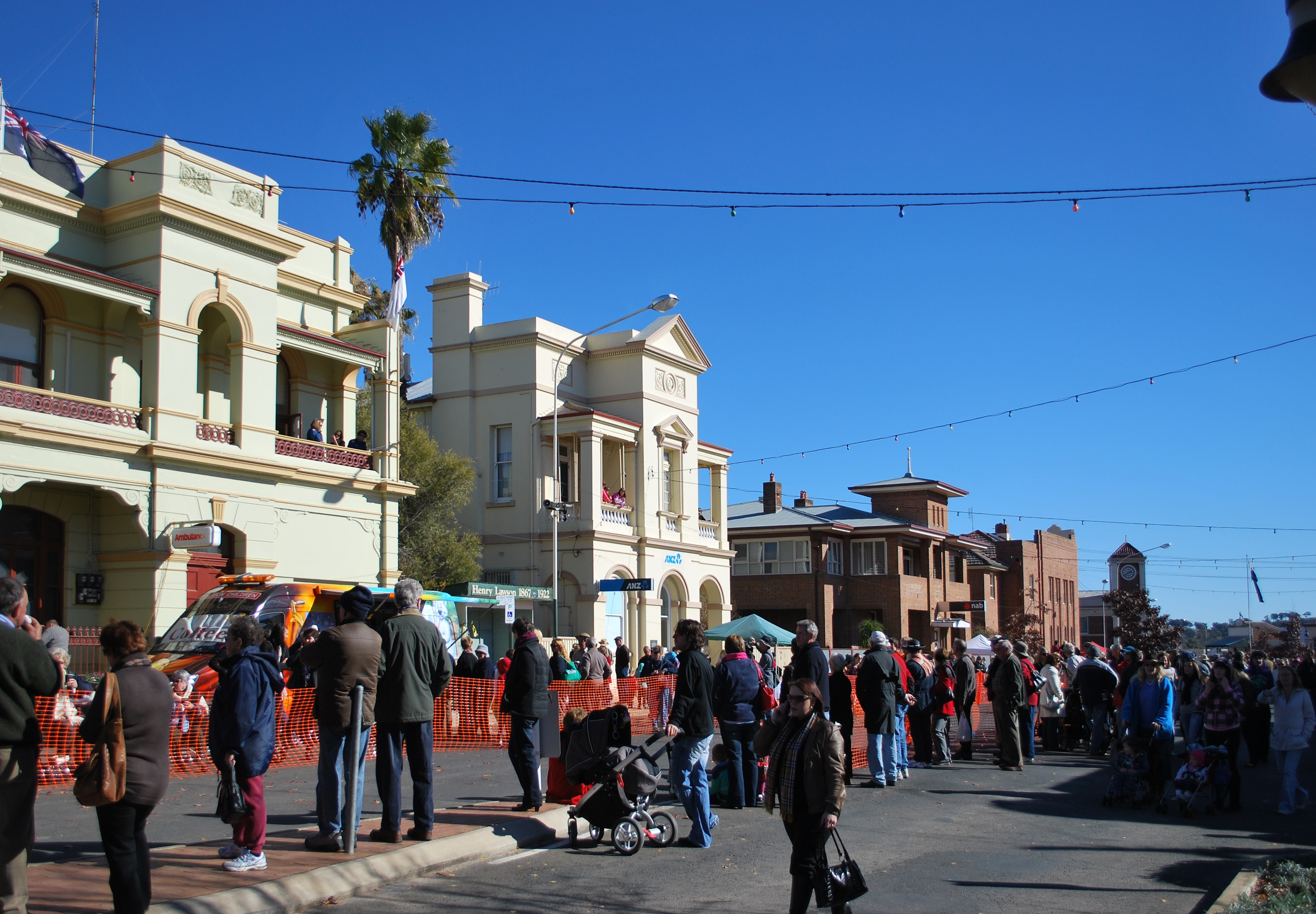
- Main Street, Grenfell, during the 2011 Henry Lawson Festival

- Coordinates: 33°54′0″S 148°09′0″E
- Country: Australia
- State: New South Wales
- LGA: Weddin Shire
- Location: 367 km (228 mi) W of Sydney; 226 km (140 mi) NW of Canberra; 197 km (122 mi) N of Wagga Wagga; 55 km (34 mi) WSW of Cowra; 51 km (32 mi) NW of Young

Government
  - State electorate: Cootamundra
  - Federal division: Riverina
- Elevation: 410 m (1,350 ft)

Population
  - Total: 2,573 (2016 census)
- Postcode: 2810
- Mean max temp: 22.5 °C (72.5 °F)
- Mean min temp: 9.4 °C (48.9 °F)
- Annual rainfall: 622.9 mm (24.52 in)

Grenfell is a town in Weddin Shire in the Central West of New South Wales, Australia. It is 370 km (230 mi) west of Sydney. It is close to Forbes, Cowra and Young. At the 2011 census, Grenfell had a population of 1,996. The town is served daily by connecting NSW TrainLink services from Sydney via Bathurst and Lithgow. Grenfell is approximately 4 3/4 hours from Sydney and 2 1/2 hours from Canberra.

== History ==
In 1866, shepherd Cornelius O’Brien discovered a gold bearing quartz outcrop. Within some weeks, large parties of miners from the Lambing Flats and Forbes diggings arrived. Tents, bark huts and a business centre grew along the banks of Emu Creek. A few months later, Grenfell was proclaimed on January 1, 1867, after Gold Commissioner, John Granville Grenfell, who was wounded by bushrangers near Narromine on 7 December 1866. John Granville Grenfell was driving a coach at the time and refused to stop when bushrangers called him to. He was shot twice in the groin and died 24 hours later. Between 1867 and 1869 over 1,100 kilograms (40,000 oz) of gold were produced each year on the Grenfell goldfields and were the richest gold fields in NSW during this time.

Grenfell was a goldmining town first known as Emu Creek and renamed in honour of John Grenfell, Gold Commissioner at Forbes, who had been killed in 1866 when bushrangers attacked a stagecoach on which he was travelling. "Weddin" Post Office opened on 3 December 1866 and was renamed "Grenfell" on 24 December the same year. By 1870-71 it was producing more gold than any other town in NSW. However, by the mid-1870s gold was in decline. During the First World War, manganese ore was mined near Grenfell for the production of ferromanganese.

Wheat was first grown in the district in 1871. In late October 1901, the railway from Koorawatha to Grenfell was officially opened. Unlike most Australian country towns Grenfell has a main street which bends.

The town's rugby league team competed for the Maher Cup.

In June 2007, the Spirit of the Bush Concert was held on the sporting fields. Acts included the organiser and Australian of the Year Lee Kernaghan, local and international star Steve Forde & the Flange, Adam Brand, Leo Sayer, Diesel, and The McClymonts.

In 2019, a mural was completed by Heesco Khosnaran upon the 1926 Grain Silos, owned by Grenfell Commodities, at request of founder Peter Mawhinney, requiring 180 litres of paint and 800 spray cans over a duration of five weeks.

== Population ==
In the 2016 Census, there were 2,573 people in Grenfell. 86.5% of people were born in Australia and 91.7% of people spoke only English at home. The most common responses for religion were Anglican 27.1%, Catholic 25.6%, No Religion 17.9% and Uniting Church 8.5%.

Historical population
Year	Pop.	±%
1921	1,192	—
1933	2,488	+108.7%
1947	2,425	−2.5%
1954	2,584	+6.6%
1961	2,360	−8.7%
1966	2,377	+0.7%
1971	2,193	−7.7%
1976	2,156	−1.7%
1981	2,070	−4.0%
1986	1,986	−4.1%
1991	2,037	+2.6%
1996	1,956	−4.0%
2001	1,922	−1.7%
2006	1,994	+3.7%
2011	1,996	+0.1%
2016	1,973	−1.2%
2021	2,022	+2.5%
Source: Australian Bureau of Statistics data.

== Grenfell railway station ==
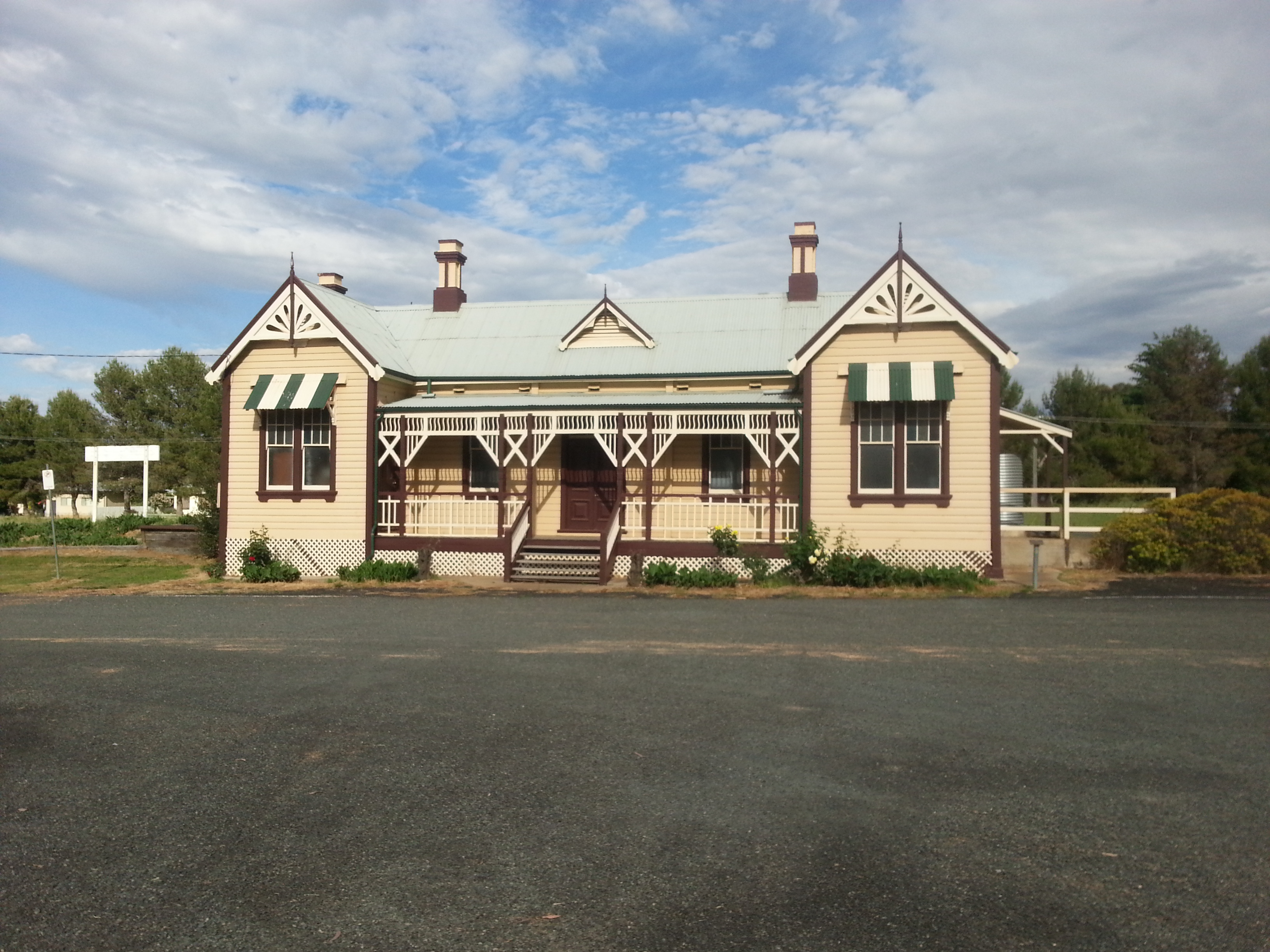
Railway Station from street side, built 1901

The Grenfell railway station is a heritage listed site.

== Attractions ==
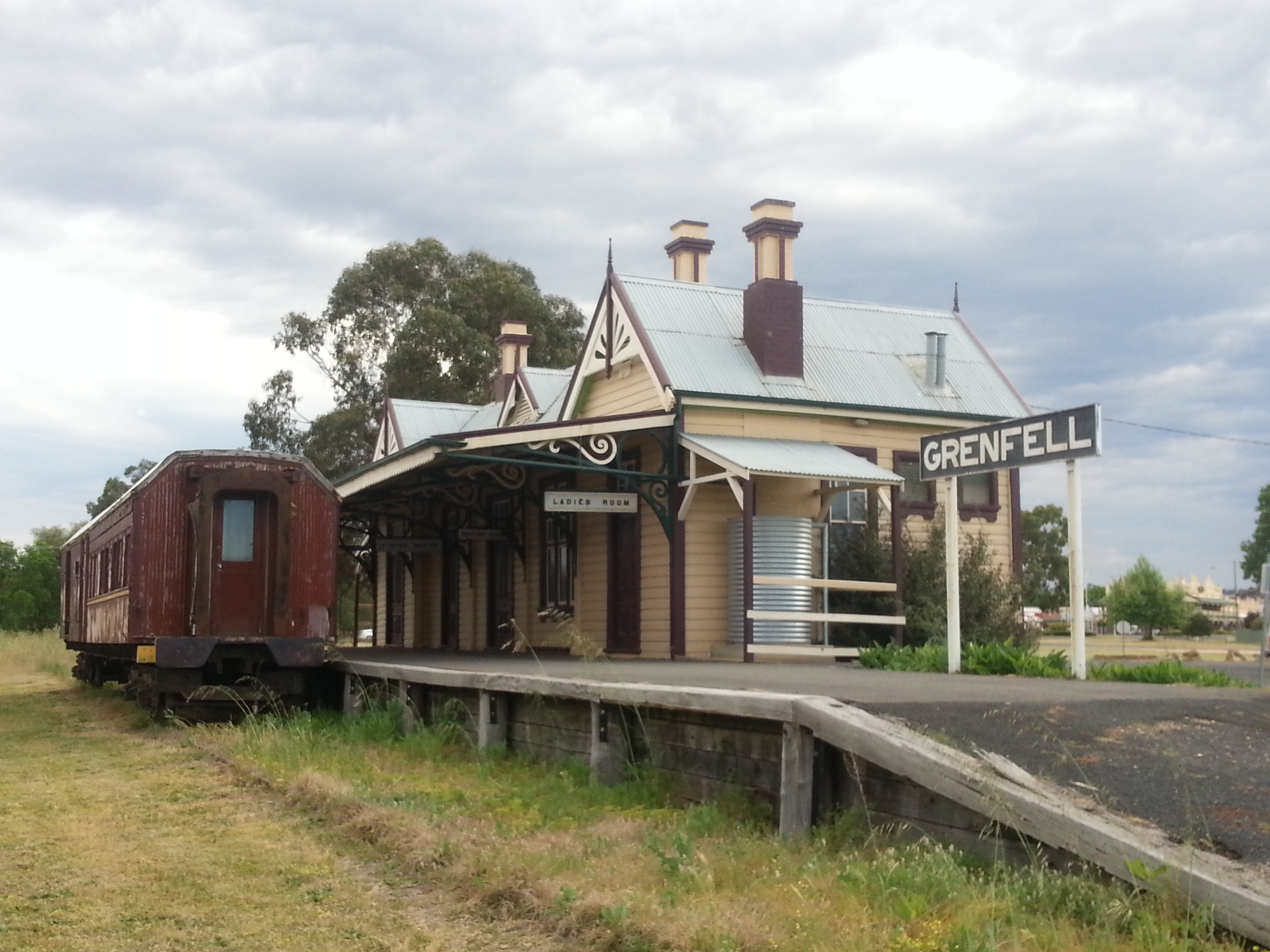
Grenfell Railway Station sign

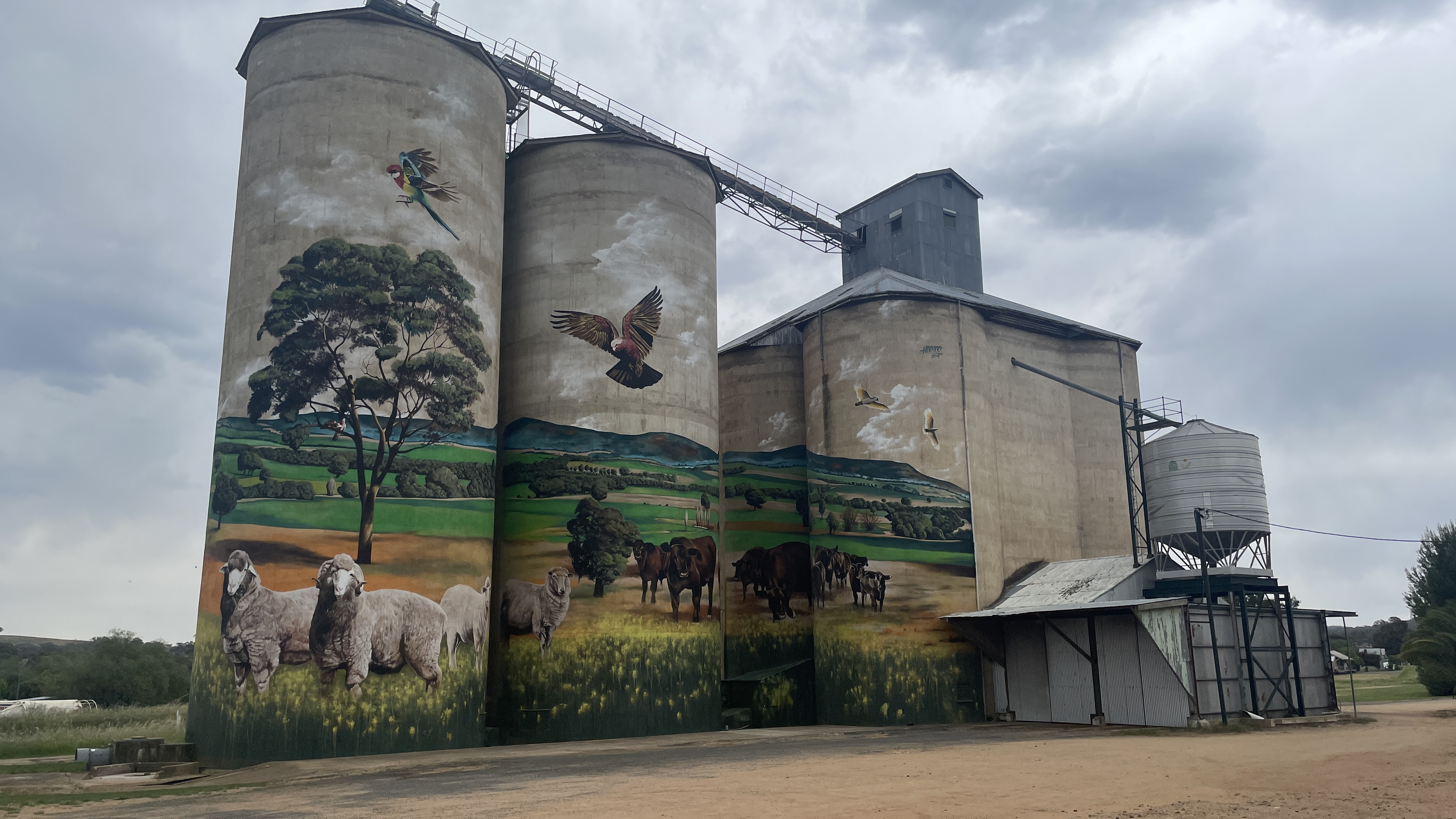
Grenfell silo art, completed in 2019 by Heesco Khosnaran (2023)

- Chrysler Car Museum
- Ochre Arch Farm Tours
- Iandra Castle
- Ben Halls Cave
- Weddin Mountains National Park
- Seaton's Farm
- Bird Watching and Bird Trails
- Endemic Garden
- Wallangreen Sculpture Garden
- Grenfell Art Gallery
- Patina Gallery
- Grenfell Museum
- Historic Railway Station
- Historic Main Street and George Street
- Henry Lawson birthplace and statues
- O'Brians Hill
- The Big Gold Pick and Pan
- Sporting Hall of Fame

== Major events ==
A full calendar of events can be found here or a list of the major events can be found below.

- Australia Day – January
- Grenfell Rodeo – March (cancelled 2021)
- ANZAC Day Commemorations – April
- Grenfell Picnic Races – April
- Henry Lawson Festival of Arts – June (cancelled 2021 & 2020, due to COVID-19)
- Grenfell Show – August/September (cancelled 2020)
- Caragabal Sheep Races – September
- Jockey Club Races – September
- Weddin Mountain Muster – September/October
- Combined Services Club Christmas Carnival – December
- Carols by Candlelight – December

== Climate ==
Typical of the South West Slopes, Grenfell features a stark difference in temperatures and sky conditions between summer and winter. Summers are hot and dry with long sunny periods interspersed with severe thunderstorms, whereas winters are cool and rainy with many overcast days. Sleet and rarely snow can fall in the winter months, despite the low altitude. There is a slight winter peak in rainfall, more so than at Cowra due to being further west.

Climate data are sourced from Grenfell (Manganese Rd), at an altitude of 390 metres (1,280 ft). Rainfall records commenced in 1885, but those of mean temperature not until 1907. Extreme temperature records are found only from 1965 onwards.

Climate data for Grenfell (Manganese Rd, 1907–2022, rainfall to 1885); 390 m AMSL; 33.89° S, 148.15° E
Month	Jan	Feb	Mar	Apr	May	Jun	Jul	Aug	Sep	Oct	Nov	Dec	Year
Record high °C (°F)	44.0 (111.2)	43.8 (110.8)	38.9 (102.0)	35.3 (95.5)	26.5 (79.7)	23.3 (73.9)	22.5 (72.5)	26.5 (79.7)	32.5 (90.5)	35.6 (96.1)	42.1 (107.8)	44.0 (111.2)	44.0 (111.2)
Mean daily maximum °C (°F)	31.8 (89.2)	30.9 (87.6)	27.8 (82.0)	22.7 (72.9)	17.8 (64.0)	13.9 (57.0)	12.9 (55.2)	14.8 (58.6)	18.4 (65.1)	22.7 (72.9)	26.7 (80.1)	29.9 (85.8)	22.5 (72.5)
Mean daily minimum °C (°F)	16.3 (61.3)	16.1 (61.0)	13.4 (56.1)	9.3 (48.7)	6.2 (43.2)	4.1 (39.4)	3.1 (37.6)	3.9 (39.0)	6.1 (43.0)	8.9 (48.0)	11.8 (53.2)	14.4 (57.9)	9.5 (49.1)
Record low °C (°F)	6.0 (42.8)	5.6 (42.1)	2.8 (37.0)	0.0 (32.0)	−2.5 (27.5)	−6.5 (20.3)	−5.0 (23.0)	−4.2 (24.4)	−2.7 (27.1)	−1.1 (30.0)	1.2 (34.2)	3.5 (38.3)	−6.5 (20.3)
Average precipitation mm (inches)	51.9 (2.04)	48.1 (1.89)	48.9 (1.93)	47.0 (1.85)	49.4 (1.94)	58.5 (2.30)	56.7 (2.23)	55.7 (2.19)	51.2 (2.02)	54.2 (2.13)	50.4 (1.98)	55.0 (2.17)	621.9 (24.48)
Average precipitation days (≥ 0.2 mm)	5.8	4.9	5.3	5.5	7.4	10.1	11.1	10.2	8.2	7.7	6.5	5.9	88.6
Average afternoon relative humidity (%)	32	36	37	43	53	64	64	56	51	41	36	32	45
Source: Australian Bureau of Meteorology

== The villages of Weddin Shire ==
- Greenethorpe – George Greene built Iandra Castle between 1886 and 1908 and established Australia's first share farming agreement. He was instrumental in providing a rail link from Koorawatha to transport wheat. Greenethorpe grew as a support town for the rural population and was named in honour of George Greene.
- Caragabal – The town developed as a staging post and watering hole for coach drivers and horses on the run between West Wyalong and Grenfell. Caragabal was once a thriving hub for railway, stock and grain. The town has an 18-hole golf course, tennis courts, bowling club and hotel.
- Quandialla – Quandialla is the aboriginal word for spiny anteater. Founded in 1914 as a railway town, Quandialla has a population of 200 people. Services in the village include the historic hotel, general store, swimming pool, and bowling club. Quandialla was the setting for the film 1915.

== Fossils ==
Grenfell is an important centre for fossils from the Devonian period which are found in many surrounding outcrops of the Hunter Siltstone geological formation.

== Sport ==
The local rugby league team is the Grenfell Goannas. Formerly of Group 9, the club currently competes in the Woodbridge Cup competition, playing its home games at Henry Lawson Park.

== Notable people ==
Notable people from or who have lived in Grenfell include:

- Sam Myers, Professional Rugby Sevens Player
- Henry Lawson, poet
- Jan Lehane, tennis player
- Stan McCabe, cricketer
- Reggie McNamara, cyclist
- Clare Hunt, soccer player

== Education ==
- Grenfell Preschool & Long Day Care Centre
- Grenfell Public School
- St Joseph's Primary School – Grenfell
- Henry Lawson High School
- TAFE NSW – Grenfell Campus

== Health Services ==
- Grenfell Hospital & Multipurpose Health Service
- Community Health
- Main Street Medical Services
- Medcirc
- Grenfell Family Dentist
- Home Care Services
- Meals on Wheels
- Weddin Community Transport
- Bowen and Physiotherapy
- Chiropractic Life
- Grenfell Pharmacy
