= Grenfell railway line =

Railway line in New South Wales, Australia

Overview
- Termini: Koorawatha; Grenfell

Technical
- Track gauge: 4 ft 8 1/2 in (1,435 mm)

The Grenfell railway line is a partly closed railway line in New South Wales, Australia. It branches from the Blayney–Demondrille railway line at the town of Koorawatha. The line opened in 1901, and closed between Greenethorpe and at the Grenfell railway station in 1991.

From the opening, until the demise of steam, there were two locations where locomotives could obtain water, Koorawatha and Grenfell. The stand at Grenfell was supplied from a purpose-built dam some 1.6 kilometres (0.99 mi) away. The stand eventually collapsed at 5:40pm on 9 February 2018. The dam, Company Dam, still remains and now supplies irrigation water to a local sporting ground.

Grain services operate between Koorawatha and Greenethorpe. Passenger services operated until 1974. The line is owned by the New South Wales Government, but in 2004 the Australian Rail Track Corporation became responsible for co-ordinating operations over the line.

== Gallery ==
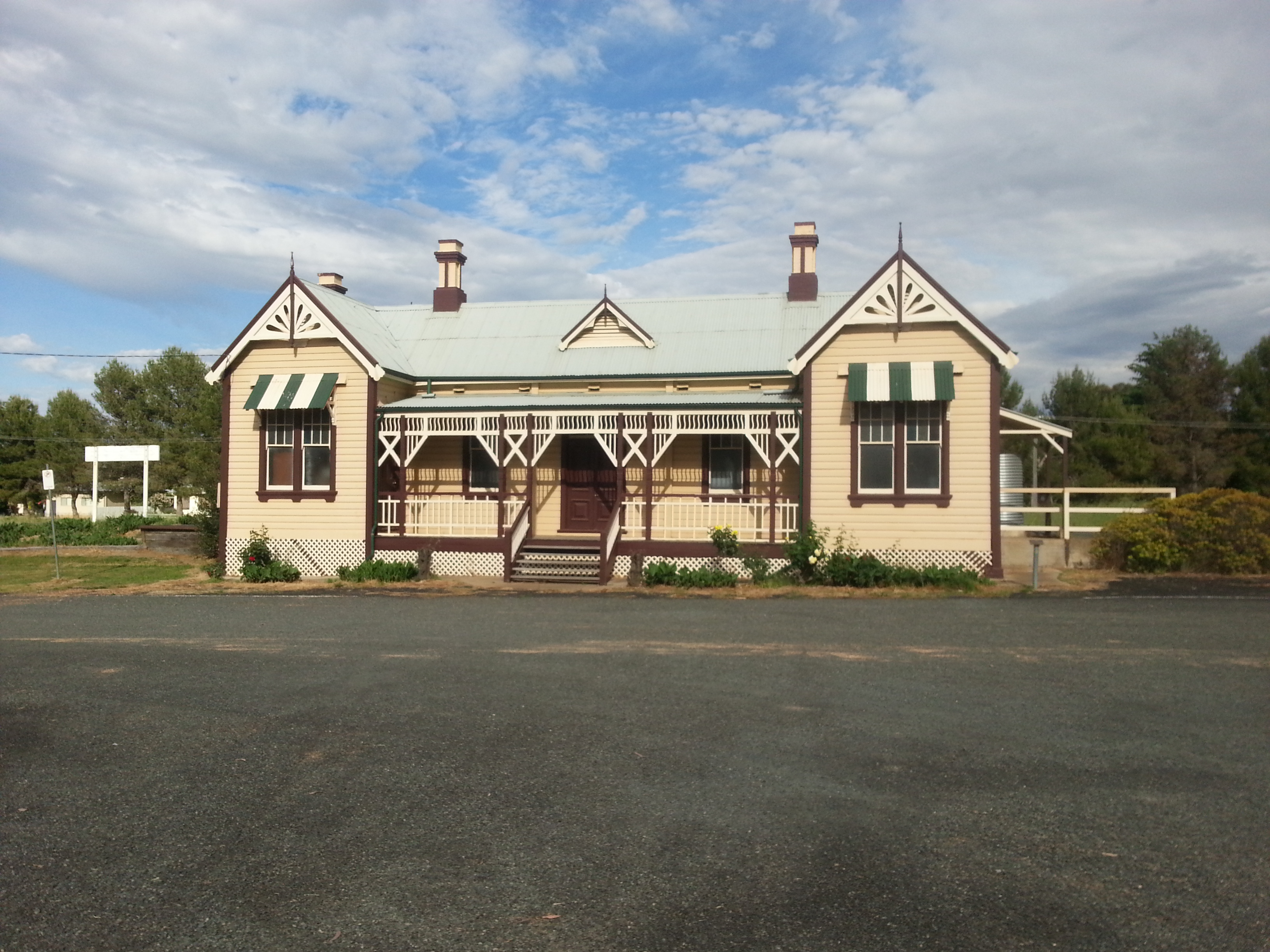
Railway Station from street side, built 1901

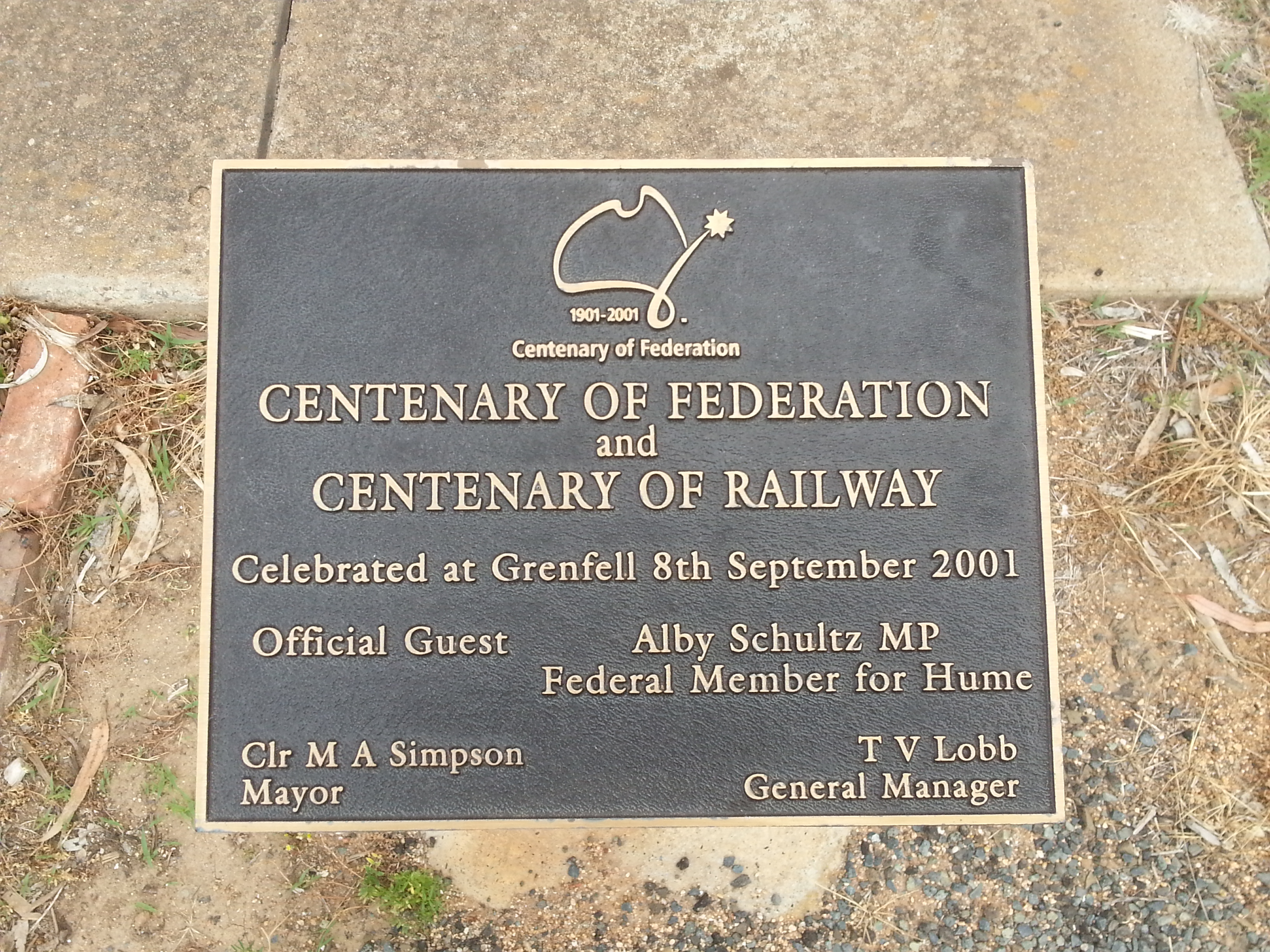
Grenfell railway centenary plaque, 8 September 1901 – 2001

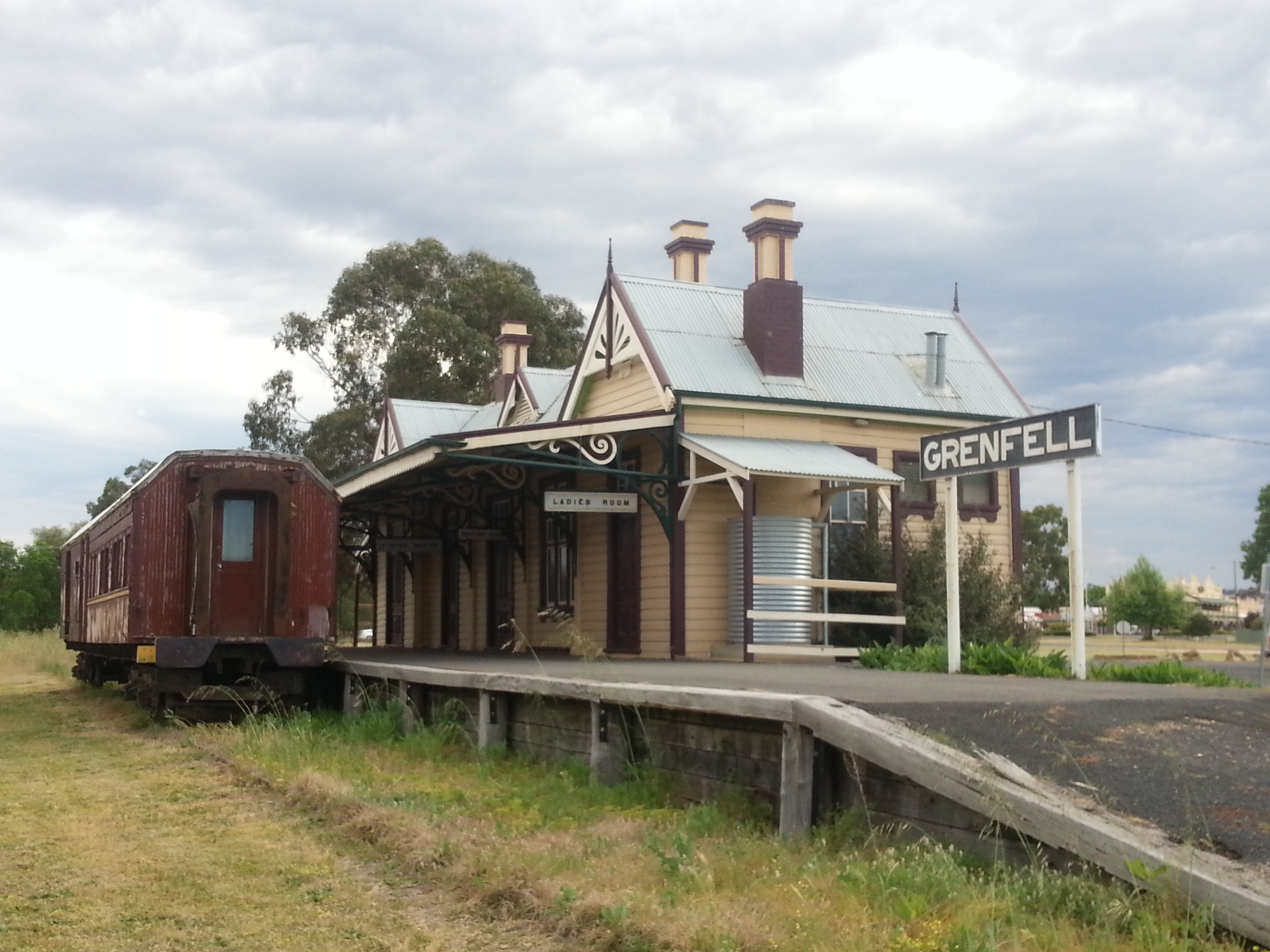
Railway Station from track side, built 1901

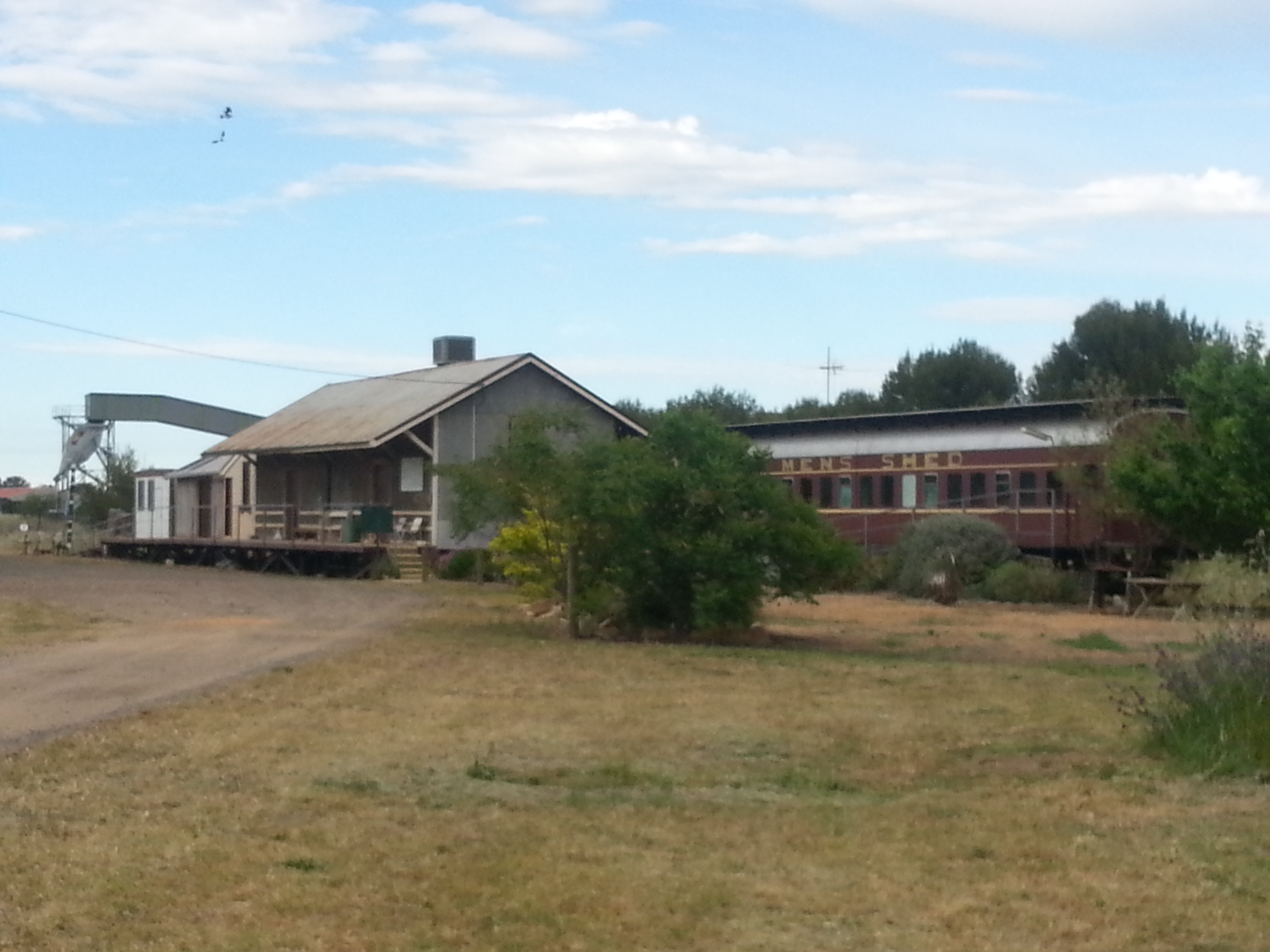
Grenfell Goods Shed, built 1901

== See also ==
- Rail transport in New South Wales
