= Henry Lawson High School =

High school in New South Wales

The Henry Lawson High School

Location
- Grenfell, Central West, New South Wales; Australia; 33°54′06″S 148°09′49″E

Information
- Type: Government-funded co-educational comprehensive secondary day school
- Motto: Challenge, Encourage, Achieve
- Opened: 3 February 1965; 61 years ago
- School district: Temora; Rural South and West
- Educational authority: NSW Department of Education
- Principal: Aaron Flagg
- Teaching staff: 18.3 FTE (2018)
- Years: 7–12
- Enrolment: 164 (2018)
- Campus type: Regional
- Website: henrylawso-h.schools.nsw.gov.au

The Henry Lawson High School (abbreviated as THLHS) is a government-funded co-educational comprehensive secondary day school, located in Grenfell, a town in the Central West region of New South Wales, Australia.

Established in 1965, the school enrolled approximately 160 students in 2018, from Year 7 to Year 12, of whom five percent identified as Indigenous Australians and four percent were from a language background other than English. The school is operated by the NSW Department of Education; the principal is Aaron Flagg.

== Overview ==
The high school was founded on 3 February 1965 after the Grenfell Intermediate School, founded in 1930, separated into Grenfell Public School and THLHS. The school was named in honour of Henry Lawson, a famous Australian poet. The school's motto is "Challenge, Encourage, Achieve".

The school was successful in the Young Achievement Australia awards in 1998 and 1999. In 2003, it was reported that the subject of chemistry would no longer be taught at the school for students preparing for the NSW Higher School Certificate.

== See also ==
- List of government schools in New South Wales: G–P
- Education in Australia
