= Grenfell railway station =

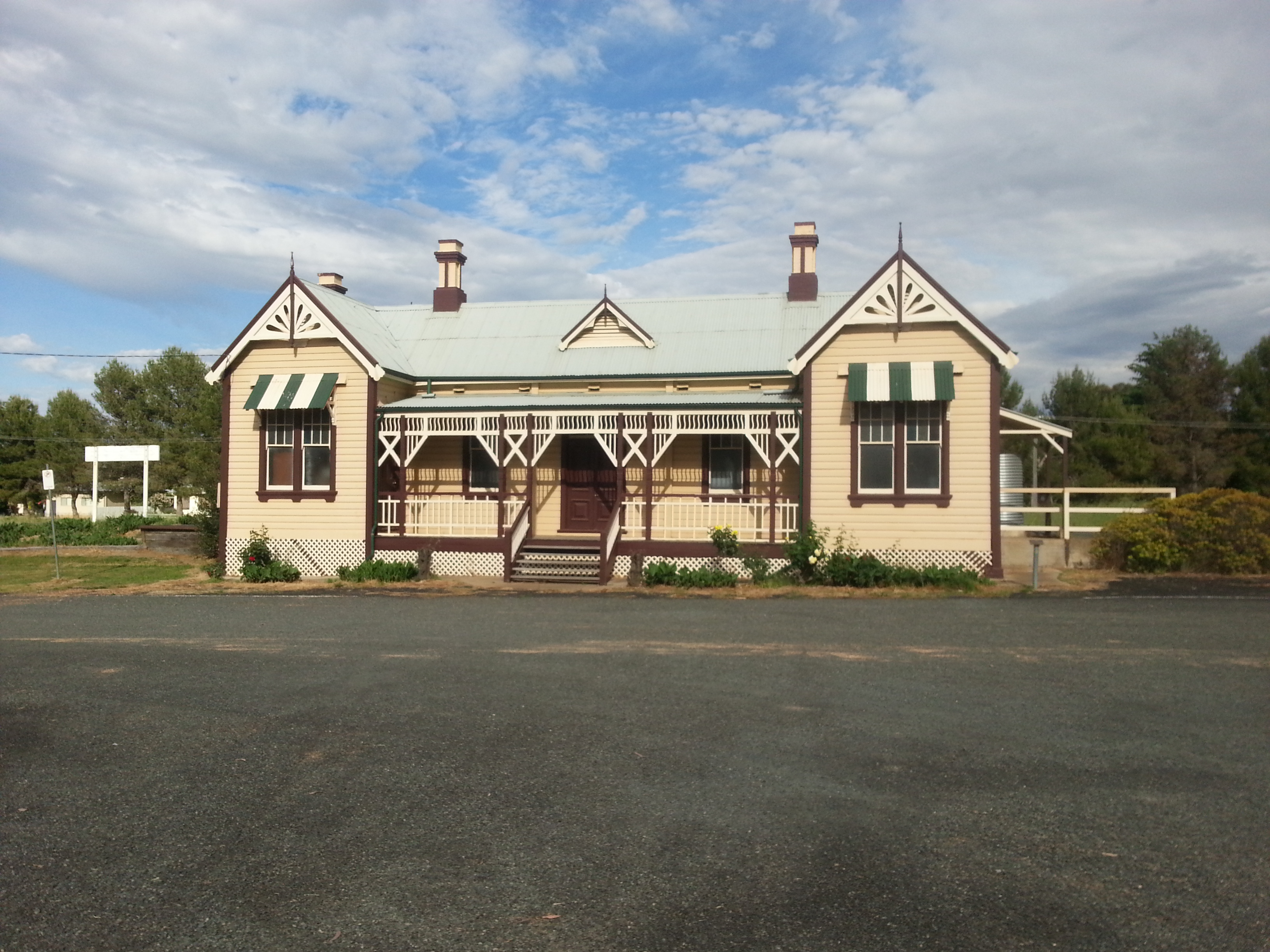
- The Grenfell railway station, as viewed from the street side, built in 1901.

- Location within New South Wales Location within Australia
- 33°53′38″S 148°09′20″E
- Location: Koorawatha-Grenfell railway line, Grenfell, Weddin Shire, New South Wales, Australia

History
- Built: 7 May 1901

Site notes
- Owner: Transport Asset Manager of New South Wales

New South Wales Heritage Register
- Official name: Grenfell Railway Station
- Type: State heritage (built)
- Designated: 2 April 1999
- Reference no.: 1155
- Type: Railway Platform/ Station
- Category: Transport - Rail

The Grenfell railway station is a heritage-listed closed railway station located on the Koorawatha-Grenfell railway line at Grenfell in the Central West of New South Wales, Australia. The property was added to the New South Wales State Heritage Register on 2 April 1999.

== Description ==
The heritage-listed complex includes a type 16 station building, built in the Pioneer sub-type 2 and class A6 design, that was completed in 1901. A goods shed, or side shed, was also completed in 1901. The platform face is timber with consolidated earth. The turntable is a Sellers 1072 type. The railway station opened on 7 May 1901.

Passenger services on the Grenfell railway line ceased in 1974. The station is closed and has been restored by local organisations. The goods shed is now used as a Men's shed, a place for local men to get together. Grenfell had the normal facilities for a terminus station, including a station building, turntable, ash pit, coal stage and water tank. The yard was rationalised in 1985, which saw the removal of the engine servicing facilities and the turntable.

== Heritage listing ==
As at 27 November 2000, the station building was probably the finest extant example of a pioneer terminus station with timber platform face, it is in fair condition and suitable for adaptive re-use. The locomotive facility is an excellent example of a small intact terminus complex capable of use and retention. It is one of the very few remaining locomotive facilities in the state.

Grenfell railway station was listed on the New South Wales State Heritage Register on 2 April 1999 having satisfied the following criteria.

The place possesses uncommon, rare or endangered aspects of the cultural or natural history of New South Wales.

This item is assessed as historically rare. This item is assessed as architecturally rare. This item is assessed as socially rare.

== Gallery ==
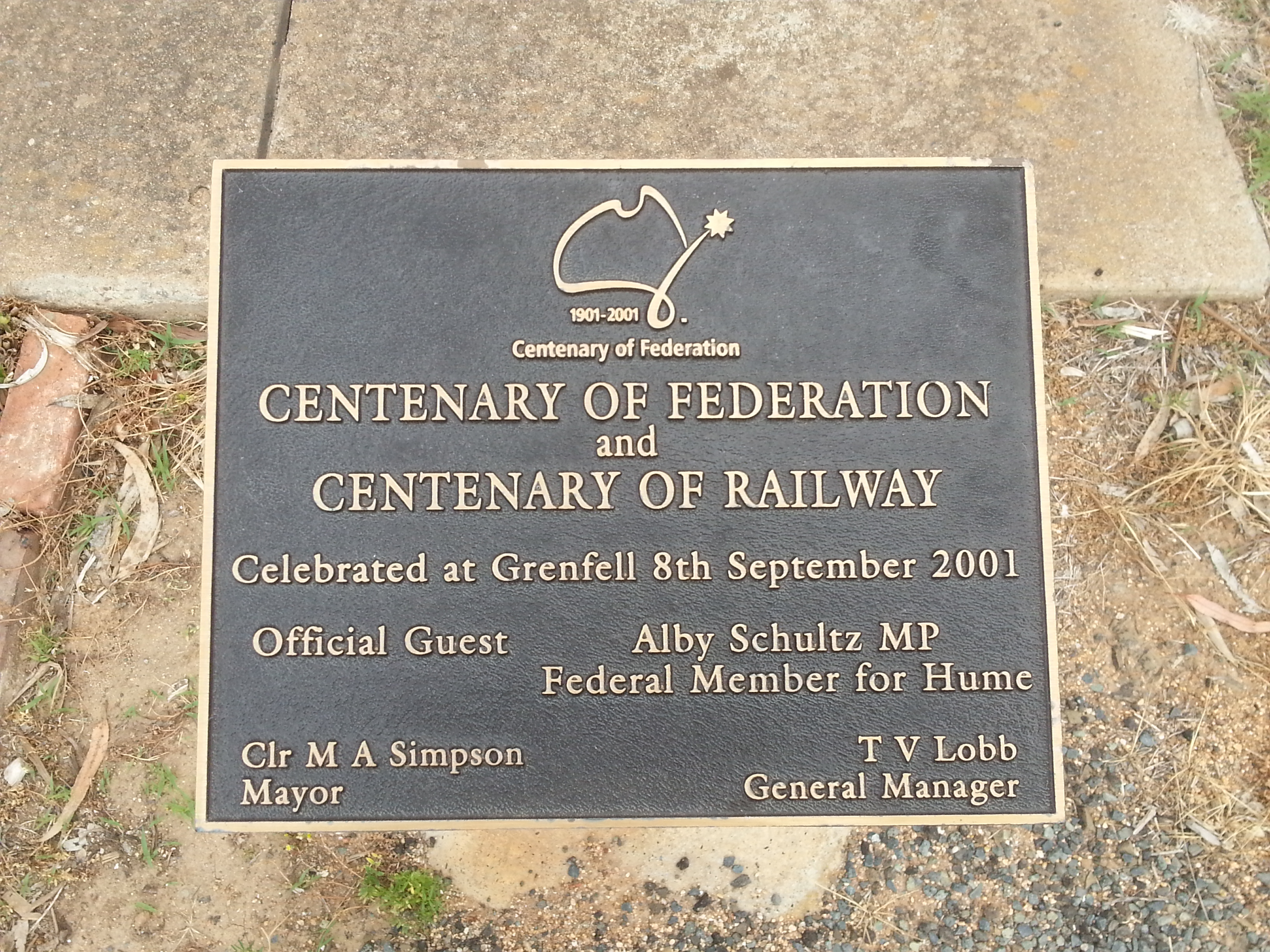
Grenfell railway centenary plaque, 8 September 1901 – 2001

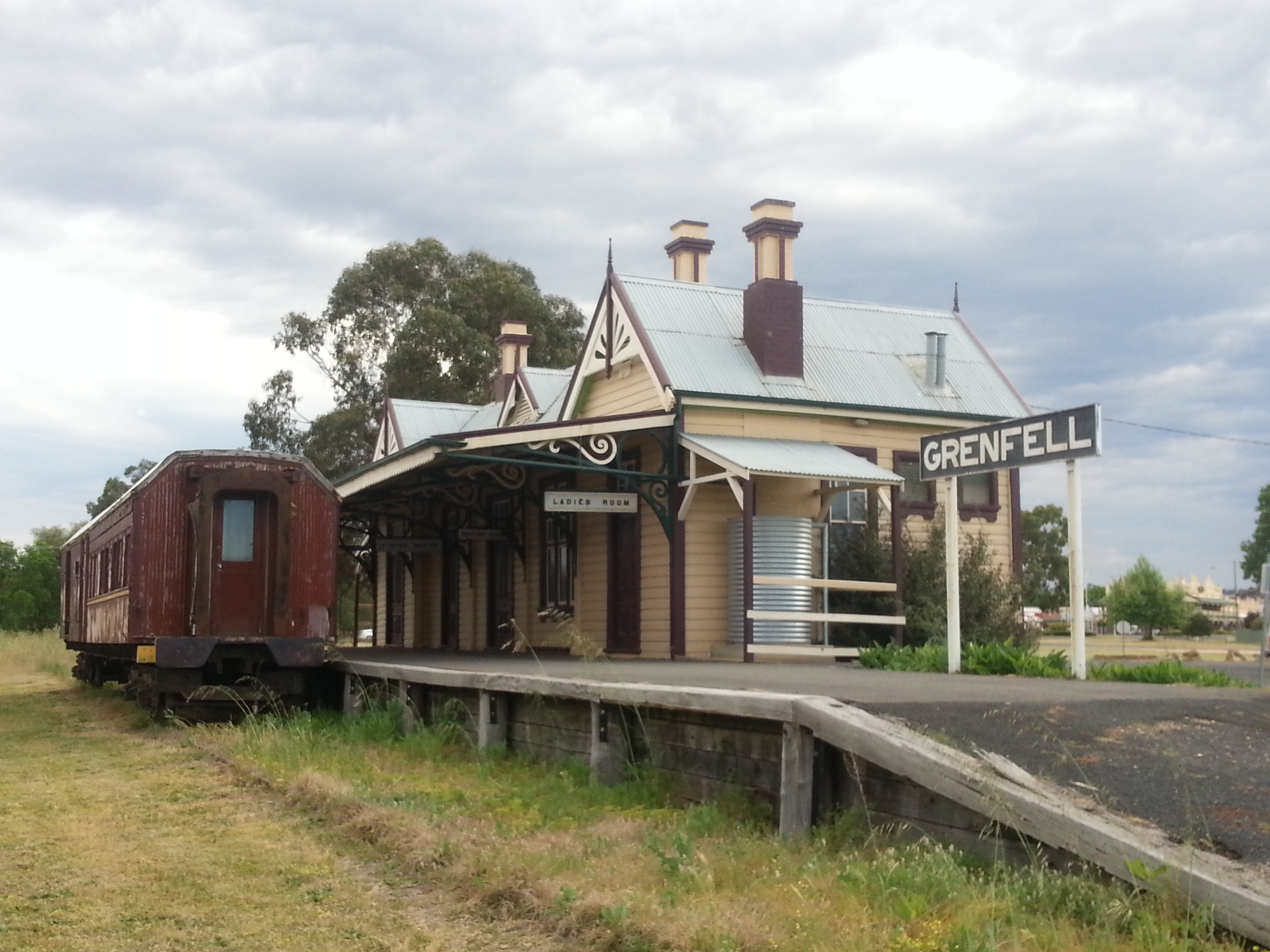
Railway Station from track side, built 1901

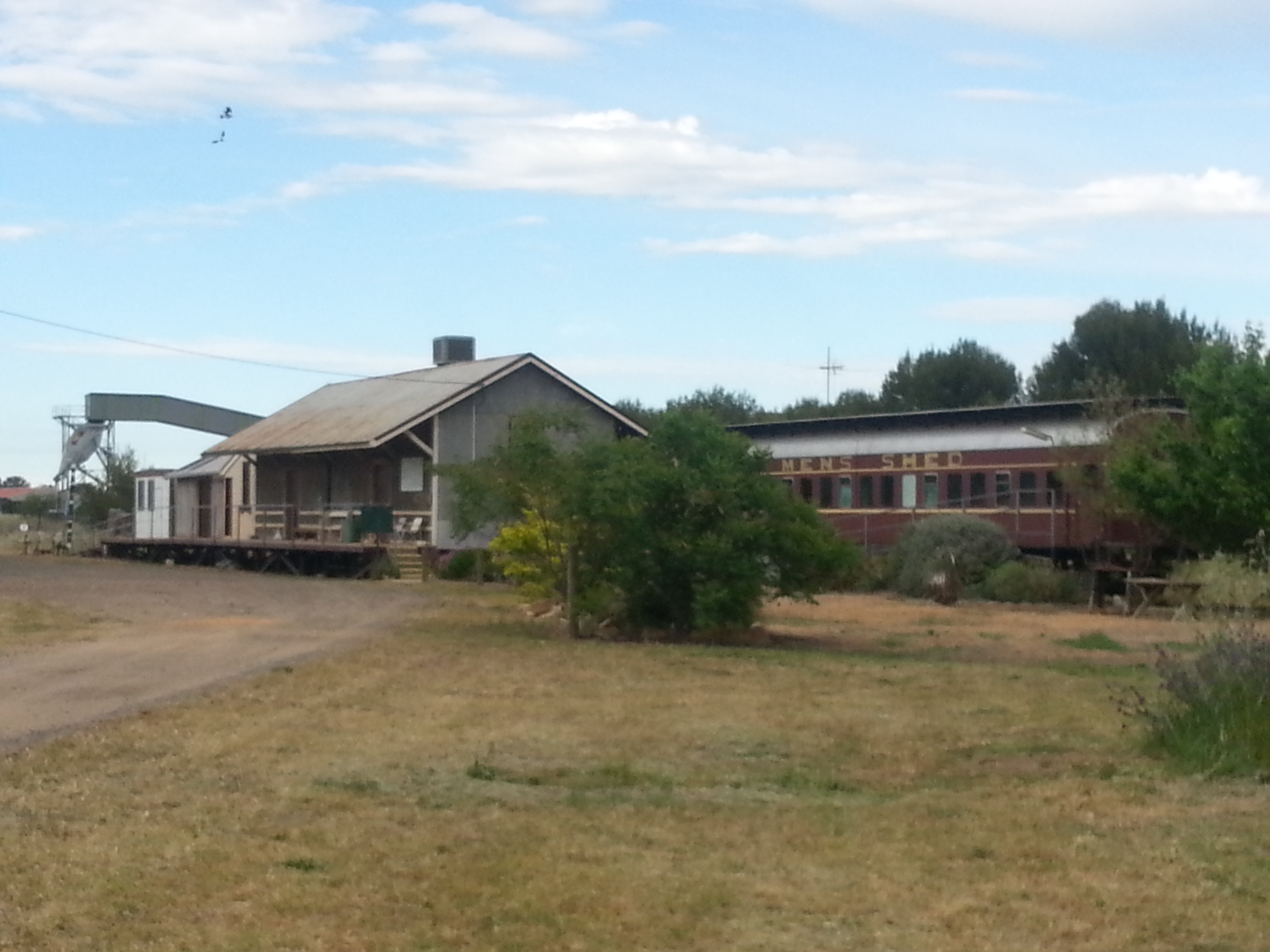
Grenfell Goods Shed, built 1901
