= Around the World in 80 Gardens =

- Genre: Documentary; Adventure travel
- Starring: Monty Don
- No. of episodes: 10

Production
- Producer: BBC
- Running time: 10 × 1 hour

Original release
- Network: BBC Two
- Release: 27 January – 30 March 2008

Around the World in 80 Gardens is a television series of 10 programmes in which British gardener and broadcaster Monty Don visits 80 of the world's most celebrated gardens. The series was filmed over a period of 18 months and was first broadcast on BBC Two at 9pm on successive Sundays from 27 January to 30 March 2008. A book based on the series was also published.

The title of the series was a reference to Jules Verne's novel Around the World in Eighty Days.

== Mexico & Cuba ==
#	Country	Garden	Notes
1.	Mexico	The Floating Gardens, Xochimilco, Mexico City	The chinampas of Lake Xochimilco, floating vegetable gardens dating back before Aztec times.
2.	Mexico	The Gardens of Luis Barragán: Casa de Luis Barragán, Casa Prieto López and Casa Antonio Gálvez	Gardens created by leading Mexican architect, Luis Barragán, in Mexico City. Website of the Barragan Foundation
3.	Mexico	The Ethno-Botanical Garden, Oaxaca	A new botanic garden containing the region's many species of cactus, built alongside the Santo Domingo Cultural Center, formerly a monastery, on a site originally slated for development as a hotel. Website
4.	Mexico	Las Pozas, Xilitla	A surreal collection of jungle plants and concrete follies created in a former coffee plantation by Englishman Edward James in the Sierra Madre Oriental. Website
5.	Cuba	Alberto's Huerto, Havana	An urban vegetable garden in the space left by a collapsed building.
6.	Cuba	Vivero Organopónico Alamar, Havana	A large urban collective organic market garden (Organopónico)
7.	Cuba	Maria's Garden, Havana	A small urban flower garden.

== Australia & New Zealand ==
Starting with Botany Bay...

#	Country	Garden	Notes
8.	Australia	The Royal Botanic Gardens, Sydney	Botanic gardens around Farm Cove at the centre of Sydney, on the site of a grain farm established by the first European settlers in 1788. Website
9.	Australia	Kennerton Green, Mittagong, New South Wales	A colonial-style garden with European planting in the hills near Sydney.
10.	Australia	The Sitta Garden, Sydney	A modern garden designed by Vladimir Sitta, including native plants and large slabs of red rock from central Australia.
11.	Australia	Alice Springs Desert Park, Northern Territory	A park near Alice Springs recreating the habitats for desert plants across central Australia. Website
12.	Australia	Cruden Farm, Langwarrin, Melbourne	Gardened continuously by Dame Elisabeth Murdoch since the 1920s.
13.	Australia	The Garden Vineyard, Moorooduc, Melbourne	A European-style garden on the Mornington Peninsula, replacing European planting with Australian natives. Website
14.	New Zealand	Ayrlies Garden, Auckland	A 12-acre (49,000 m^{2}) country garden created since 1964 in a paddock east of Auckland by Beverley McConnell. Website
15.	New Zealand	Te Kainga Marire, New Plymouth	A domestic city garden of native New Zealand plants. Its name is Māori for "the peaceful encampment". Website

== India ==
#	Country	Garden	Notes
16.	India	Taj Mahal and the Mehtab Bagh, Agra	Website, Garden Visit review.^{[p]}
17.	India	Akbar's Tomb, Sikandra	
18.	India	The Monsoon Garden, Deeg	Gardens of the Deeg Palace. Garden Visit review
19.	India	Jal Mahal, Jaipur	
20.	India	Hindu Temple Shrine Garden, Jaipur	
21.	India	Mr Abraham's Spice Garden, Thekkady, Kerala	An organic spice garden. Website
22.	India	The Old Railway Garden, Munnar, Kerala	The garden is maintained by the Kanan Devan Hill Plantations Company. The company is South India's biggest Tea producer and exporter and is also the first ever employee owned plantation company in India. Tea Purchase Website Company Website
23.	India	The Rock Garden, Chandigarh	A sculpture garden created illegally by transport official Nek Chand who started the garden secretly in his spare time in 1957. Today it is spread over an area of forty-acres (160,000 m^{2}), it is completely built of industrial & home waste and thrown-away items. Website

In addition to the Old Railway Garden, Don also featured the surrounding "tea gardens" (tea plantations). He expressly did not count it as one out of the eighty, however.

== South America ==
#	Country	Garden	Notes
24.	Brazil	Burle Marx's Copacabana Promenade, Rio de Janeiro	
25.	Brazil	Garden of the Sítio Roberto Burle Marx, Rio de Janeiro	
26.	Brazil	The Floating Gardens, The Amazon River	The locals live in floating houses on the river, and they grow vegetables and medicinal plants in small barges attached to their houses
27.	Brazil	Bacu's Forest Garden, The Amazon	
28.	Argentina	Carlos Thays's garden at Estancia Dos Talas, Dolores, Buenos Aires, in The Pampas	In the middle of the limitless pampas a grand French-style mansion with gardens in 1500 hectares of lands and the infinite pampas beyond. Website
29.	Chile	The private garden of Chilean landscape architect Juan Grimm at Bahia Azul, Los Vilos	

== United States of America ==
#	Country	Garden	Notes
30.	United States	LongHouse Reserve, East Hampton, New York	The Long Island gardens housing Jack Lenor Larsen's sculpture collection. Website
	United States	Central Park, New York	
31.	United States	Gantry Plaza State Park, New York	A garden at Hunters Point in Queens, beside historic ship-loading gantries on the East River. Designed by Thomas Balsley. Website
32.	United States	Liz Christy Garden, Manhattan, New York	The first community garden in New York City, founded in 1973 by local resident Liz Christy on a vacant lot on the corner of Bowery and Houston Street. Website
33.	United States	James Van Sweden's garden at Ferry Cove, Chesapeake Bay, Maryland	A modern garden of grasses, melting into the surrounding landscape.
34.	United States	Monticello, Charlottesville, Virginia	The garden of the author of the US Declaration of Independence and third President of the United States, Thomas Jefferson. Website^{[a]}
	United States	Tallgrass Prairie National Preserve, Kansas	
35.	United States	The Huntington Botanic Garden, San Marino, California	A 120-acre (0.49 km^{2}) botanic garden around the Huntington Library, laid out in the early 20th century. Website
36.	United States	Lotusland, Montecito, Santa Barbara, California	The gardens of opera singer Madame Ganna Walska. Website^{[a]}
37.	United States	Roland Emmerich's Garden, Hollywood, California	An instant mature garden for the Hollywood director and producer, with tall palm trees installed to provide privacy.
38.	United States	The Greenberg Garden, Brentwood, Los Angeles	Designed by Mia Lehrer.

== China & Japan ==
#	Country	Garden	Notes
39.	China	The Humble Administrator's Garden, Suzhou	16th-century garden, with many pavilions, island, pools and bridges.
40.	China	The Lion Grove, Suzhou	
41.	China	The Imperial Summer Palace, Beijing	Complex of palaces and gardens northwest of Beijing, covering 3.5 km^{2}, looted and destroyed by the British and French in 1860.
42.	Japan	Ryoan-ji Temple, Kyoto	Famous karesansui (dry landscape) rock garden. Part of the World Heritage Site. Website
43.	Japan	Issidan, Ryogen-in Temple, Kyoto	Large Japanese rock garden.
44.	Japan	Totekiko, Ryogen-in Temple, Kyoto	Small Japanese rock garden.
45.	Japan	Urasenke Tea Garden, Kyoto	Tea room built by Sen Sōtan. Website
46.	Japan	Tofuku-ji Temple Garden, Kyoto	Designed by Mirei Shigemori in the 1930s, including a moss garden and Japanese maples. Website

== The Mediterranean ==
#	Country	Garden	Notes
47.	Italy	Villa d'Este, Tivoli	A spectacular Renaissance garden with many fountains. Website ^{[i]}
48.	Italy	Villa Adriana, Tivoli	The remains of the garden set out for Roman Emperor Hadrian around his palace.^{[i]}
49.	Italy	Elio's vineyard, Tivoli	A private fruit and vegetable garden.
50.	Italy	Villa Lante, Bagnaia	A 16th-century Mannerist gardens of surprises.
51.	Morocco	The Aguedal, Marrakesh	Royal vegetable gardens dating to the 12th century, irrigated with water from the Ourika valley, with water stored in large central cisterns. Garden Visit review^{[p]}
52.	Morocco	The Majorelle, Marrakesh	The botanical garden created by French artist Jacques Majorelle in 1924, and restored by Yves Saint Laurent and Pierre Bergé in the 1980s. Website
53.	Spain	The Alhambra and Generalife, Granada	The gardens of the Moorish palace in Andalusia. Website^{[p]}
54.	Spain	The Patios of Córdoba	Private courtyard gardens, opened to the public in May each year, in the annual Courtyards Festival of Córdoba. WebsiteTourism Information
55.	Spain	Casa Caruncho, Madrid	The private garden of Spanish landscape gardener, Fernando Caruncho. Website

== South Africa ==
#	Country	Garden	Notes
56.	South Africa	Kirstenbosch National Botanical Garden, Cape Town	A botanic garden on the eastern slopes of Table Mountain. Website
57.	South Africa	Henk Scholtz's garden, Franschhoek near Cape Town	
58.	South Africa	The Company's Garden, Cape Town	Originally created to provide fresh food to passing ships, using water from natural springs; now a city park.
59.	South Africa	Stellenberg, Kenilworth, Cape Town	
60.	South Africa	Donovan's L'il Eden, Hout Bay, Cape Town	A garden in a Cape squatter camp.
61.	South Africa	Kirklington, Ficksburg, Free State	A garden established in the first half of the 20th century by English expatriate Edward Tudor Boddam-Whetham and his wife Ruby Newberry, daughter of Charles Newberry. It makes careful management of scarce water resources, and is named after Edward's ancestral home, Kirklington Hall in Nottinghamshire. Photos
62.	South Africa	The Savanna Rock Garden, Magaliesberg, Johannesburg	A rock garden created by a married couple (one a sculptor, the other an artist).
63.	South Africa	Brenthurst Gardens, Parktown, Johannesburg	The garden of Strilli Oppenheimer, wife of Nicky Oppenheimer. Website
64.	South Africa	Thuthuka School Garden, Tembisa Township near Johannesburg	A garden in a township school.

== Northern Europe ==
#	Country	Garden	Notes
65.	(United Kingdom) UK	Rousham Park, Oxfordshire	Perhaps the first English landscape garden, created by William Kent in the early 18th century. Website
66.	(United Kingdom) UK	Sissinghurst Castle, Kent	Influential English garden created in the 1930s by Vita Sackville-West and her husband Harold Nicolson; owned by the National Trust since 1967. Website
67.	France	Chateau Villandry, The Loire Valley	Acres of parterre and box hedge, recreated in the 20th century. Website
68.	France	Claude Monet's Garden, Giverny	Obsessively painted by Monet; now receiving over half a million visitors each year. Website
69.	Belgium	Jacques Wirtz's Garden, Schoten, Antwerp	The private garden of Belgian landscape artist Jacques Wirtz, including his trademark "cloud" box hedges. Website
70.	Netherlands	Het Loo Palace, Apeldoorn	The Baroque Dutch garden of William III and Mary II, originally designed by Claude Desgotz in the 1680s but replaced by an English landscape garden in the 18th century; restored from 1970 to 1984 to its appearance in 1700. Website
71.	Netherlands	The Boon Family Garden, Oostzaan, Amsterdam	An example of a small modern domestic garden, designed by Piet Oudolf for Dutch architect Piet Boon.
72.	Norway	The Arctic Alpine Botanic Gardens, Tromsø	The northernmost botanic garden in the world, 200 miles (320 km) inside the Arctic Circle. Website

== South East Asia ==
#	Country	Garden	Notes
73.	Thailand	Jim Thompson's Garden, Bangkok	A jungle garden created by American Office of Strategic Services agent and silk merchant, Jim Thompson. Website
74.	Thailand	The Grand Palace, Bangkok	Official residence of the King of Thailand. Website (Monty Don also visited the agricultural research fields at the Chitlada Palace.)
75.	Thailand	The Klong Gardens, Bangkok	Don visits one of the private gardens that line the canals of Bangkok, accompanied by actress Patravadi Mejudhon.
76.	Singapore	The City in a Garden	The landscaping fulfilling the vision of former Prime Minister Lee Kuan Yew, to soften the harshness of urban life by clothing Singapore in green. Singapore National Parks website
77.	Singapore	Wilson Wong's Community Garden	An urban vegetable garden created as a community project.
78.	Indonesia	Pura Taman Ayun, Mengwi, Bali	A 17th-century Hindu temple ("Taman Ayun" is Balinese for "beautiful garden"). Don also visited the Denpasar night Market.
79.	Indonesia	Traditional Home Compound, Ubud, Bali	A typical Balinese private household. Don also visited Villa Batujimbar, luxury resort visited by Mick Jagger and Jerry Hall
80.	Indonesia	Villa Bebek, Sanur, Bali	A modern Balinese garden, designed by Australian Made Wijaya (Michael White). Website

== References and Notes ==
a.^{a1} ^{a2} Revisited in Monty Don's American Gardens
i.^{i1} ^{i2} Revisited in Monty Don's Italian Gardens
p.^{p1} ^{p2} ^{p3} Revisited in Monty Don's Paradise Gardens

== See also ==
- Monty Don's Italian Gardens
- Monty Don's French Gardens
- Monty Don's Paradise Gardens
