= Sombeke Castle =

Castle in Belgium

- Belgium
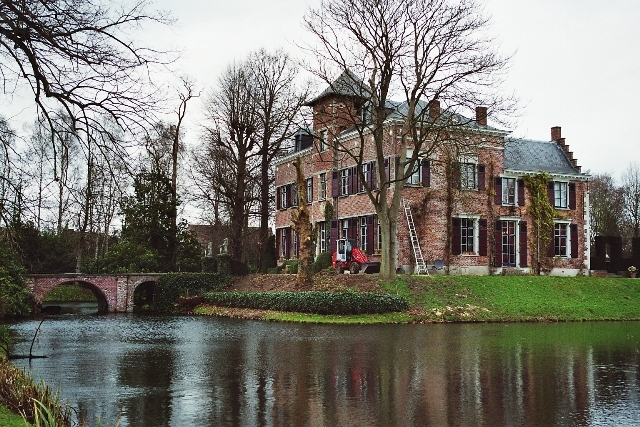

Site information
- Type: Castle

Location
- Coordinates: 51°6′38.1″N 4°7′45.45″E

Sombeke Castle (Dutch: Kasteel van Sombeke) is a castle in Sombeke, part of the East Flemish municipality of Waasmunster, located at Kasteelstraat 18–22.

== History ==
Presumably it was here that the lords of Sombeke resided. The earliest known lords were mentioned in 1448, but there is evidence indicating that the moated castle was created earlier, as early as the late 12th century.

In 1696 the manor was bought by Jacobus Laureyns and in the course of the period 1696-1716 he renovated the castle, which had fallen into disrepair. In 1727 the lordship passed to Anton François Joseph de Castro y Toledo. In the first half of the 19th century, the domain came to the Beelen van Puyvelde. In the 18th century there was an upper court and a lower court, surrounded by a double moat.

== Building ==
The castle, surrounded by moats, is accessed through a gatehouse, which also houses a coach house and stables. On the front of the gatehouse is the coat of arms of the de Castro y Toledo. A brick arch bridge leads to the moated castle island. The castle has essentially a rectangular plan with a symmetrical facade in which there is a low square tower in the center that protrudes slightly. At the rear are two stepped gables. The interior has kept little of the original furnishings.

The garden was created in the early 1990s by Jacques Wirtz.

== Gallery ==
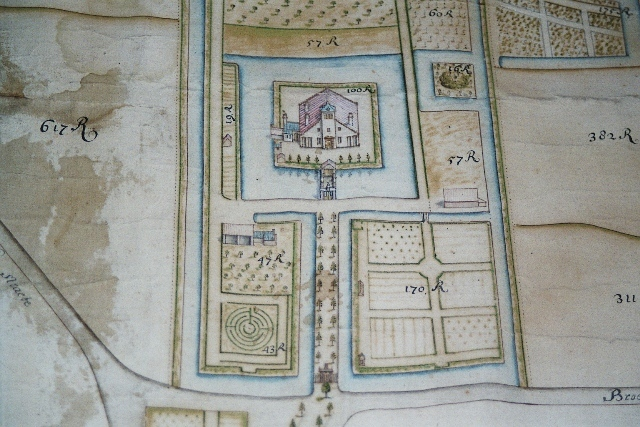

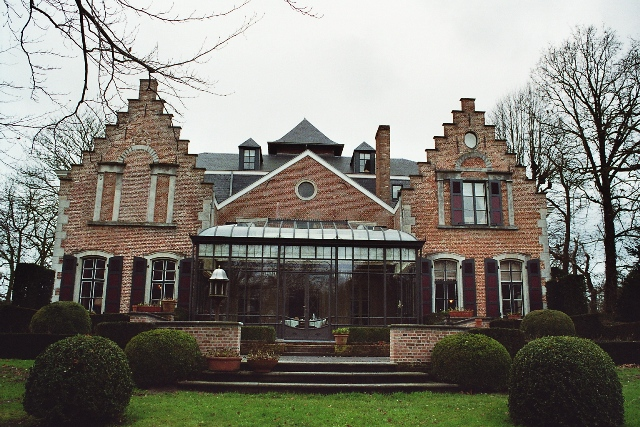

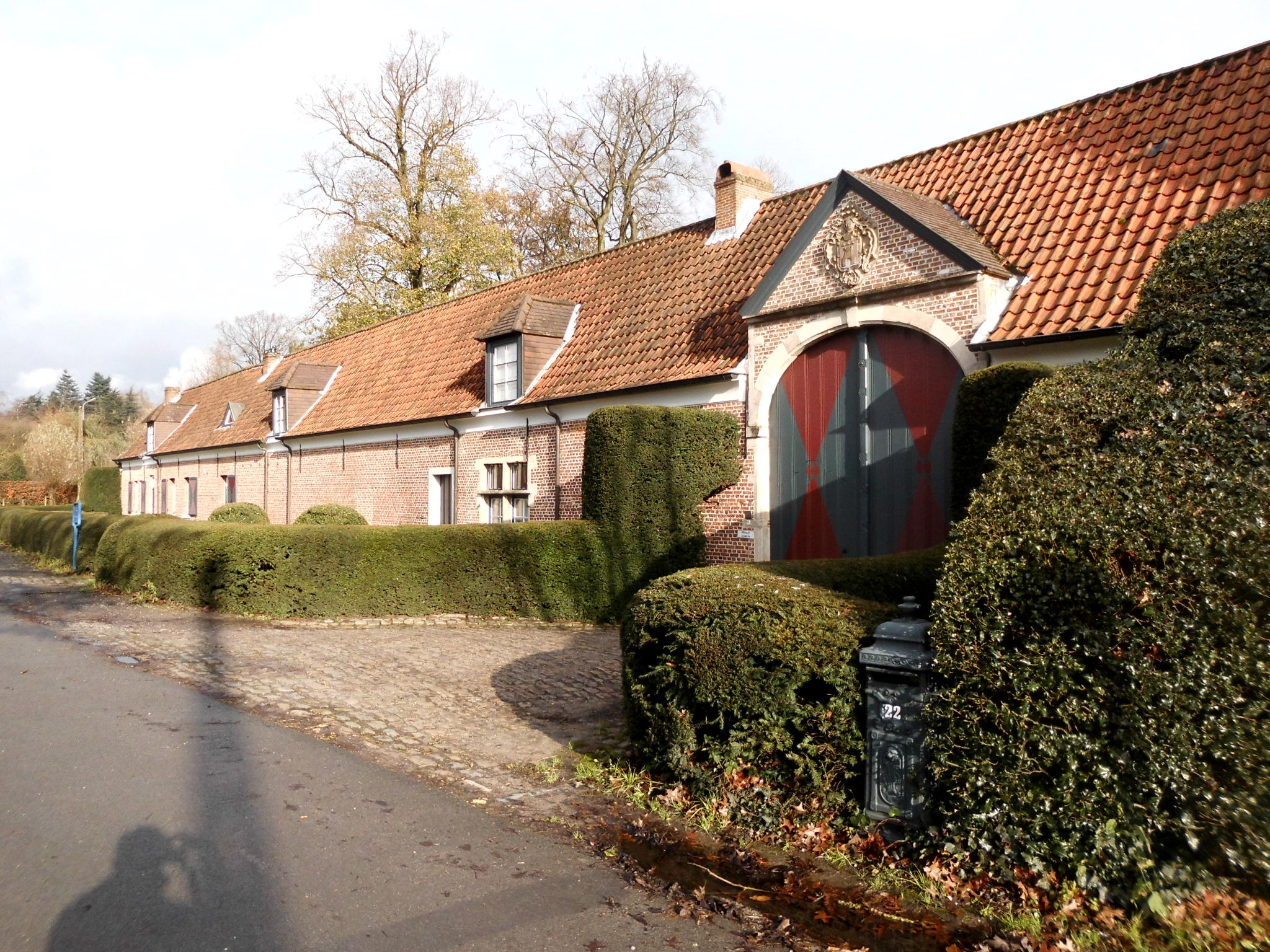

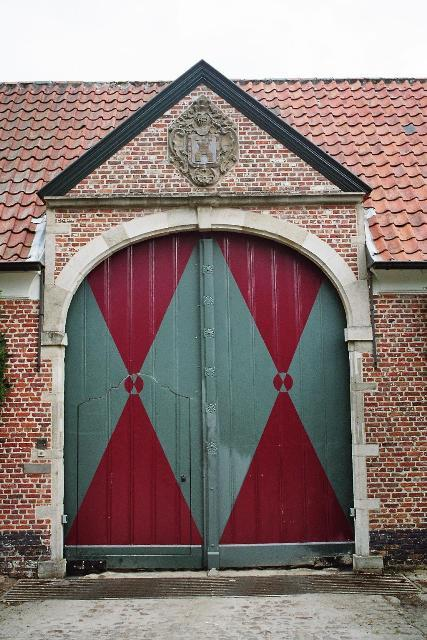
