= Arctic–Alpine Botanic Garden =

Botanic garden in Tromsø, Norway

Coordinates: 69.6768°N 18.9763°E

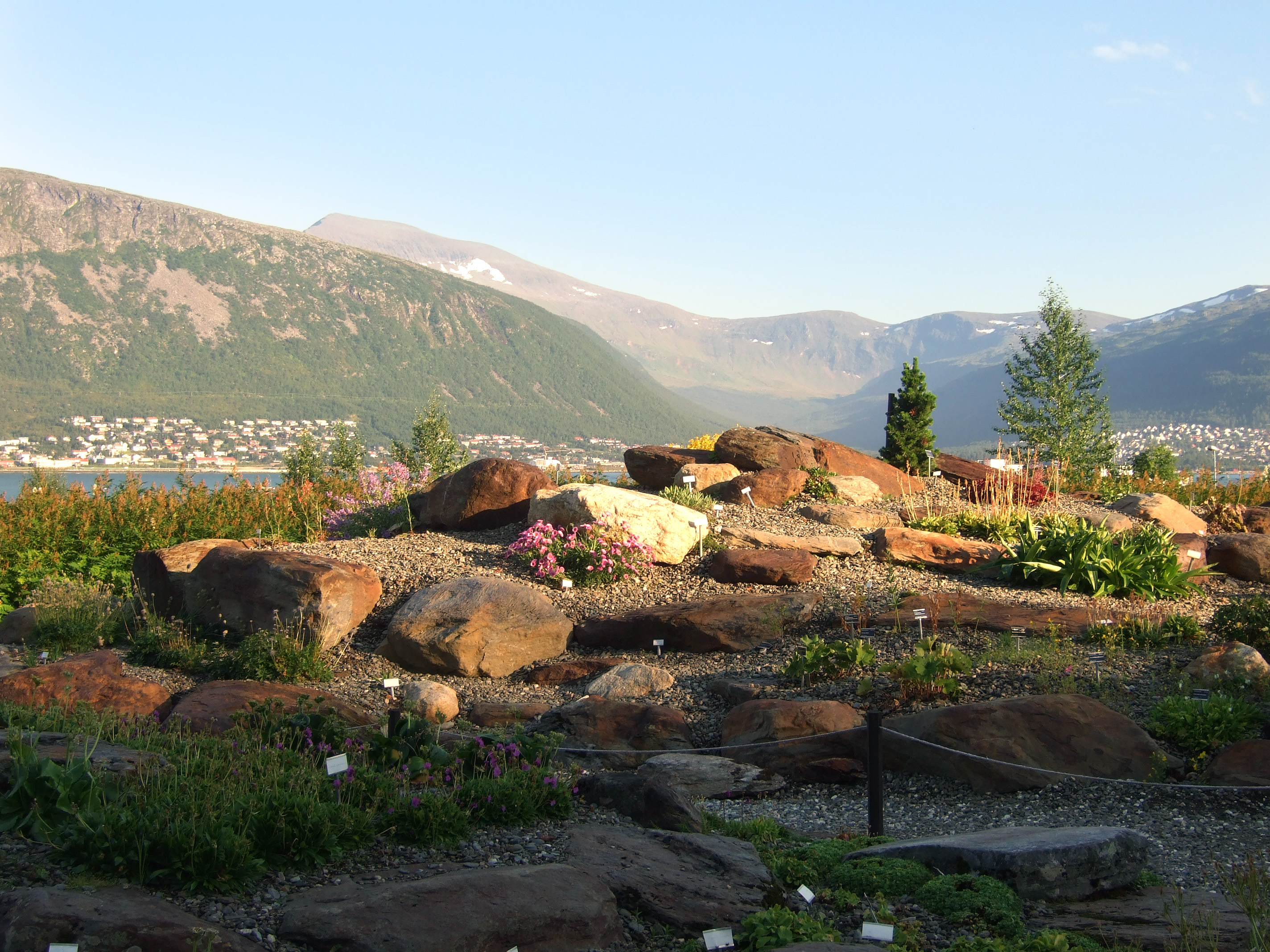
Arctic-alpine Botanic Garden, the valley Tromsdalen and the mountain Tromsdalstind can be seen in the background.

The Arctic–Alpine Botanic Garden (Arktisk alpin Botanisk hage) is the world's northernmost botanic garden. It is located in Tromsø, Norway, and is run by the Tromsø University Museum. It opened in 1994. The garden displays Arctic and alpine plants from all over the Northern Hemisphere.

The garden is located to the southeast of the University of Tromsø Campus, commanding a view of the mountains to the east and south. There is no gate or barrier: there is no entrance fee, and the garden is open all day all night the year round.

== Climate ==
The location, corresponding to the north coast of Norway, invites thought of an extreme Arctic climate. However, a branch of the Gulf Stream sweeping up the coast of North Norway provides a moderating influence, and the climate of Tromsø is one of relatively mild winters (January average −4.4 °C (24.1 °F)) and cool summers (July average 11.7 °C (53.1 °F)). The season in the Botanic Garden is usually from end of May until mid October. From May 15 until July 27, the sun is continuously above the horizon in Tromsø. This period of midnight sun provide some compensation to the plants for the short growing season and the low temperatures, providing an average of 200 hours of actual sunshine each of the months May, June, and July. From November 21 until January 17 the sun never rises. Snow generally covers the ground from October or November on, and will accumulate until the beginning of April. Snow then gradually melts and the ground will usually be bare around mid May at sea level, while lingering on far into the summer at higher altitudes.

== Special Collections ==
The garden features rhododendron (e.g. R. Lapponicum), Meconopsis, Aster, Polemonium, Erigeron, Codonopsis, Rose cultivars, Allium, Saxifraga, Silene, Tellima, Heu

== In popular culture ==
As part of his 2008 Around the World in 80 Gardens BBC television series, British horticulturist Monty Don visited the garden, talking to curator Arve Elvebakk and botanist Brynhild Mørkved.
