= Juan Grimm =

Chilean landscape architect (born 1952)

- Born: 7 April 1952 (age 74); Santiago de Chile
- Education: Pontifical Catholic University of Chile
- Occupation: Landscape architect

Juan Grimm Moroni (born 7 April 1952) is a Chilean landscape architect. He has designed and built nearly 1000 hectares of gardens, in addition to public and private parks in Chile, Argentina, Peru and Uruguay. His name has become synonymous with exuberant and generous parks and gardens. His designs are known for the respect they show for the natural environment and for how they integrate naturally with the surrounding landscapes.

== Biography ==
Born in Santiago de Chile, Juan Grimm began studying architecture in 1970 at the Pontifical Catholic University of Valparaíso (UCV). Two years later, he moved to Santiago to finish his degree at the Pontificia Universidad Católica de Chile.

As one of the most well-known landscapers of Latin America, Juan Grimm has designed and built nearly 1000 hectares of gardens and parks in Chile, Argentina, Peru and Uruguay, including the gardens of the Bahá'í House of Worship for South America.

His gardens have been disseminated in many landscaping and architecture magazines and books. Among these, a few stands out: Around the World in 80 Gardens by Monty Don (BBC, 2002), En busca del paraíso. Jardines Excepcionales del Mundo (Blume, 2007); Futurescapes. Designer for Tomorrow's Outdoor Spaces (Thames and Hodson, 2011); The Gardener's Garden (Phaidon, 2014), and Landscape Architecture (Phaidon, 2015). Grimm won the Premio de Arquitectura Joven at the Bienal de Arquitectura de Santiago (1978) and won, alongside Hans Muhr, first place at the Congreso Internacional de Paisajismo of Buenos Aires (1985), judged by Roberto Burle Marx.

== Projects ==
- Alessandri Park (Concepción, Chile)
- Jaime Guzmán Memorial (Santiago, Chile)
- Gardens of the Bahá'í House of Worship for South America (Santiago, Chile)
- Gardens of Viña Santa Carolina vineyard (Macul, Chile)
- Gardens of Viña Errazuriz vineyard (Región de Valparaíso, Chile)
- Ocho al Cubo (Marbella, Chile)
- Cerro del Medio Park (Santiago, Chile)
- Urubamba Garden (Sacred Valley, Urubamba, Cuzco, Perú)
- Parque Laguna San Nicolás Park (Montevideo, Uruguay)
