= Monty Don's French Gardens =

British television show

- Genre: Documentary; Adventure travel
- Starring: Monty Don
- No. of episodes: 3

Production
- Producer: BBC
- Running time: 3 × 1 hour

Original release
- Network: BBC Two

Monty Don's French Gardens is a television series of three programmes in which British gardener and broadcaster Monty Don visits several of France's most celebrated gardens. A book based on the series, The Road to Le Tholonet: A French Garden Journey, was also published.

== Episodes ==
=== Episode 1: Gardens of Power and Passion ===
Monty Don explores the gardens of France and the ways in which they displayed the power and influence of French nobility. He finds the spirit and style of old French gardens in restored gardens, brand new gardens, and even in the heart of modern-day Paris. A very important part of the powerful gardens were to be able to show the amount of wealth and power the owner of the garden has and to impress others.

Historical Figures Discussed:

- Diane de Poitiers
- Catherine de Medici
- André Le Nôtre
- King Louis XIV
- Nicholas Fouqet

Places Visited:

- Château de Chenonceau
- Vaux le Vicomte
- Versailles
- Champ de Bataille
- Château de Courances
- La Defense

Chenonceau Garden is located in the Loire valley of France. The garden is made up of multiple gardens, and the main two gardens were owned by prominent figures: Catherine de Medici and Diane de Poiters.

=== Episode 2: The Gourmet Garden ===
Monty Don travels across France visiting numerous gardens specialising in fruit and vegetable production. He unfolds the French's love of food has influenced their garden designs and core purpose. In doing so, he explores themes of form versus function; growing for consumption, for market, and for aesthetic; and terroir (location, climate, and soil). In this episode, he visits the following gardens and sites:

- Monastère de Solan (Cévennes)
- vineyard of Val Joanis
- Chateau of Villandry in the Loire Valley
- Potager du Roi at Versailles
- jardins ouvriers, or workers' gardens, in Paris
- Le jardin des Sambucs
- The restaurant La Chassagnette in Camargue
- Potager at Priorie Notre-Dame d'Orsan in the French region of Berry

In comparison to the first episode of the series, Monty Don is focused less on the roles of the rich and powerful in developing France's garden aesthetic. Instead, he employs a social history of France, rather than a political history, to develop a sense of French gardens and their relationship with food.

=== Episode 3: The Artistic Garden ===
In the final episode of the mini-series, Don once again travels across France in search of the country's most venerated gardens. This segment focuses on the relationship and intersections between gardens and art. Don visits the gardens of two of France's most famous artists - Paul Cézanne and Claude Monet - to explore how their landscapes influenced their work and also tours more contemporary gardens that fuse together artistic aesthetics with the natural and doctored landscapes. In this episode, he visits the following gardens and sites:

- Giverny, the garden of Claude Monet
- Jas de Bouffan, the home of Paul Cézanne
- Mont Sainte-Victoire, featured in many Cézanne landscapes
- Villa Noailles, a cubist garden
- La Louve, Nicole de Vesian's dream Provençal garden
- Patrick Blanc's home in Paris, featuring a tropical wall garden
- Sericourt, near the town of Arras (creation of Yves Gosse de Gorre)
- Le Jardin Plume (The Feather Garden) near Lyons-La-Floret
- Don revisits Giverny in the conclusion of the episode as well to see the water lilies in bloom

== See also ==
- Around the World in 80 Gardens
- Monty Don's Italian Gardens
- Monty Don's Paradise Gardens
