= MS Polstjerna =

Preserved ship museum in Tromsø, Norway

Coordinates: 69°38′38″N 18°57′04″E

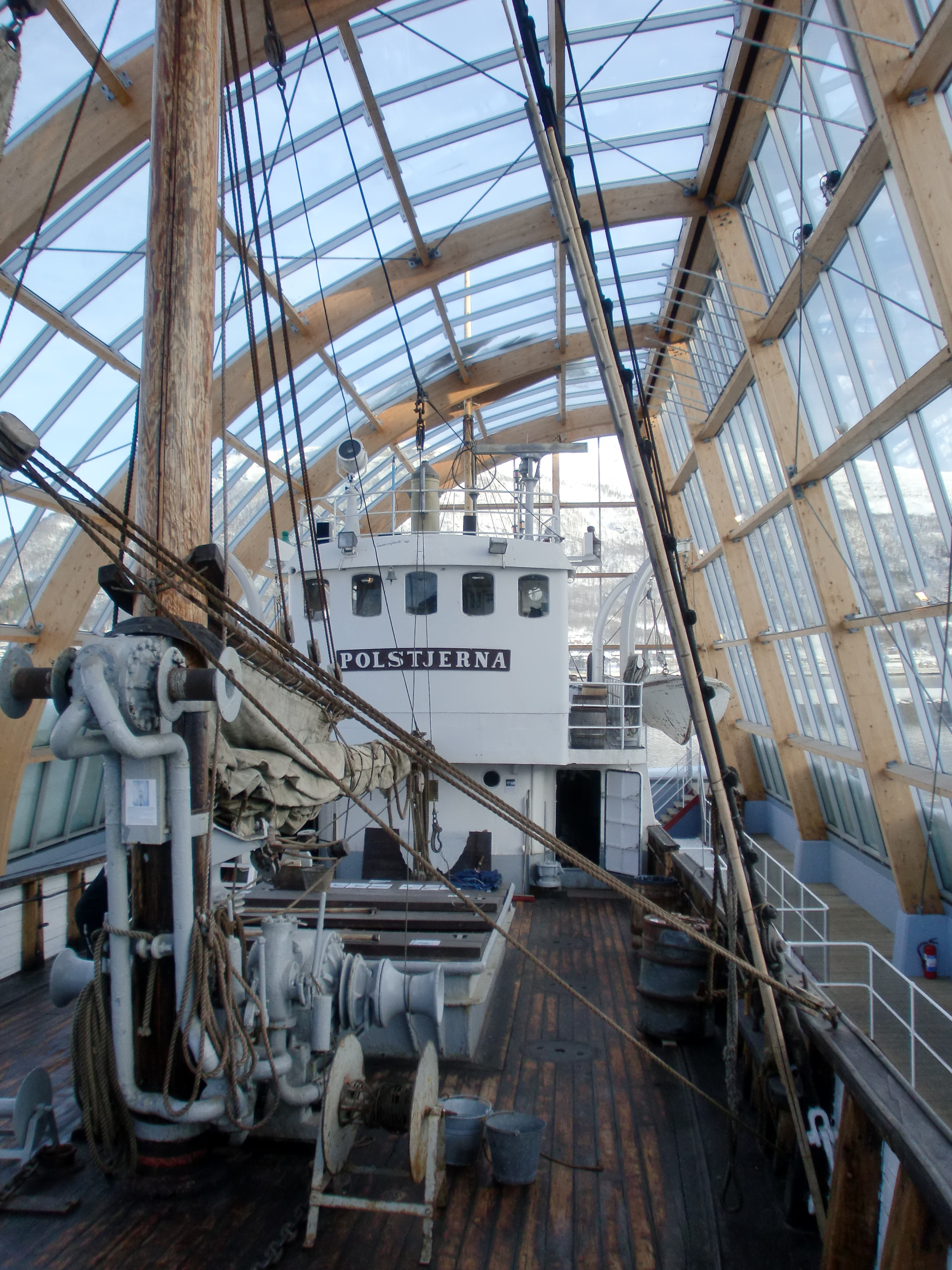
The top deck of the MS Polstjerna

MS Polstjerna is Norway's best-preserved sealing ship. The Polstjerna is owned by the Tromsø University Museum, and since 2004 it been exhibited in a dry dock in a conservation building near Polaria in Tromsø.

== History ==
The vessel was built at Moen's shipyard near Risør in the spring of 1949 and launched the same spring. The ship had 33 fishing seasons and harvested close to 100,000 seals from the West Ice and East Ice, before its final season in 1981. It was then purchased by the Arctic Society (Arktisk Forening) and later transferred to the University Museum.

== Dimensions ==
It is 28.3 metres (92 ft 10 in) long, 7 metres (23 ft 0 in) wide and has a tonnage of 129 gross tons and a draft of 2.5 metres (8 ft 2 in) forward and 4 metres (13 ft 1 in) aft. The masthead is 19 metres (62 ft) from the waterline.

== Conservation ==
The building that houses the drydocked ship was designed by the Per Knudsen architectural firm, which won an architectural competition for the facility. The building also features temporary and permanent exhibits.

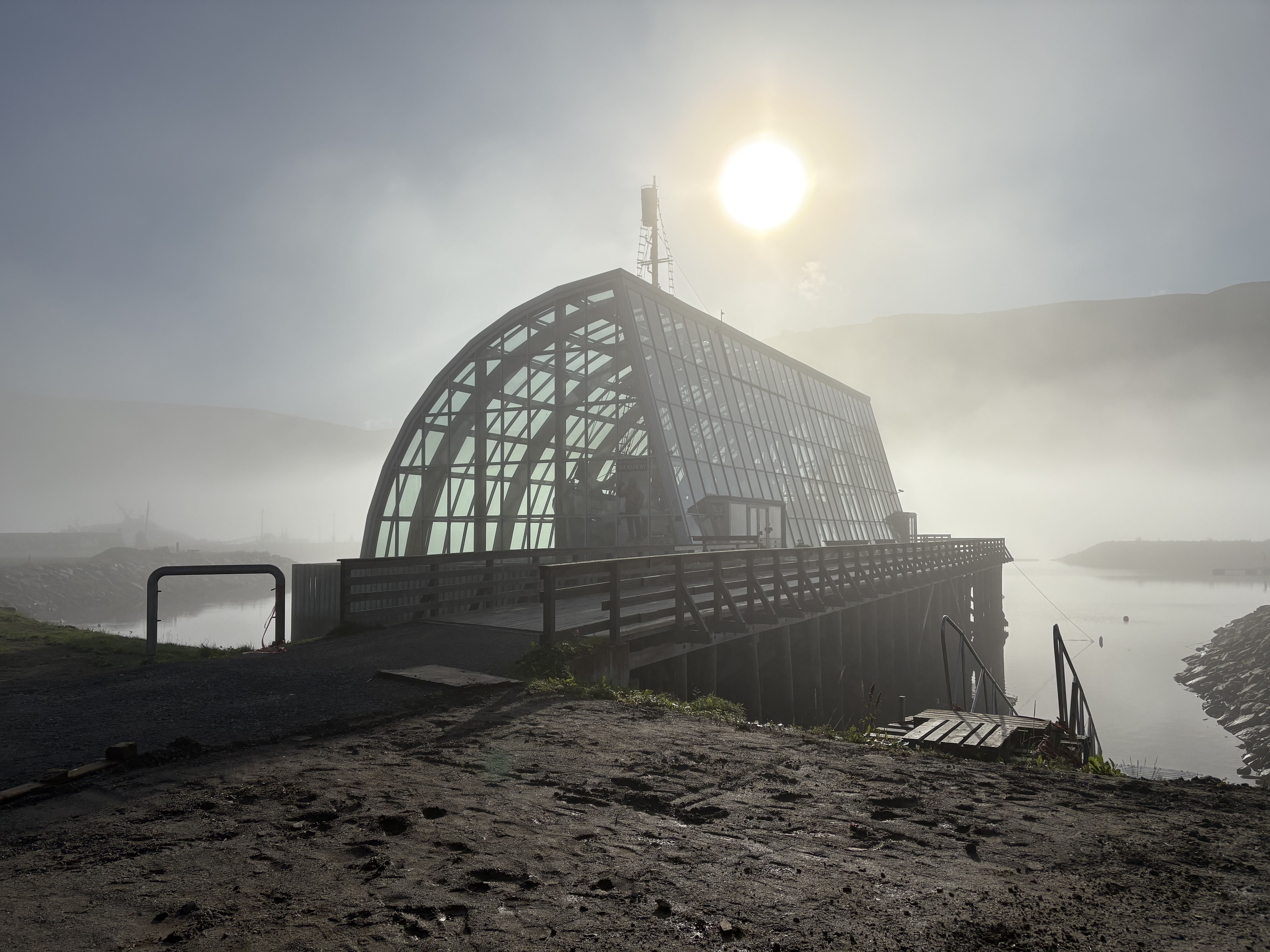
MS Polstjerna's conservation building
