= Tsubo-niwa =

Very small Japanese garden

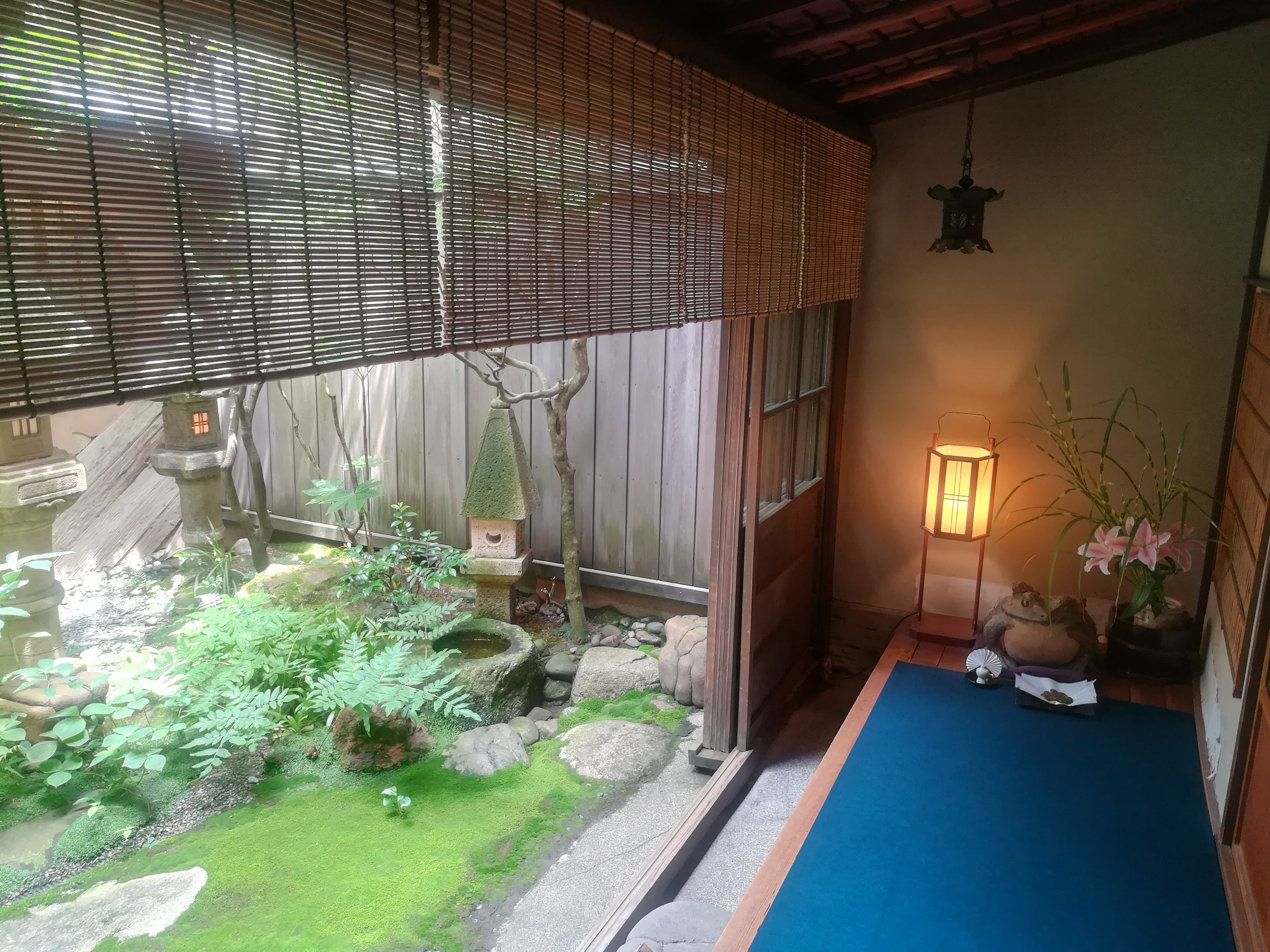
A tsubo-niwa is meant to be seen from indoors. Note sliding glass doors.

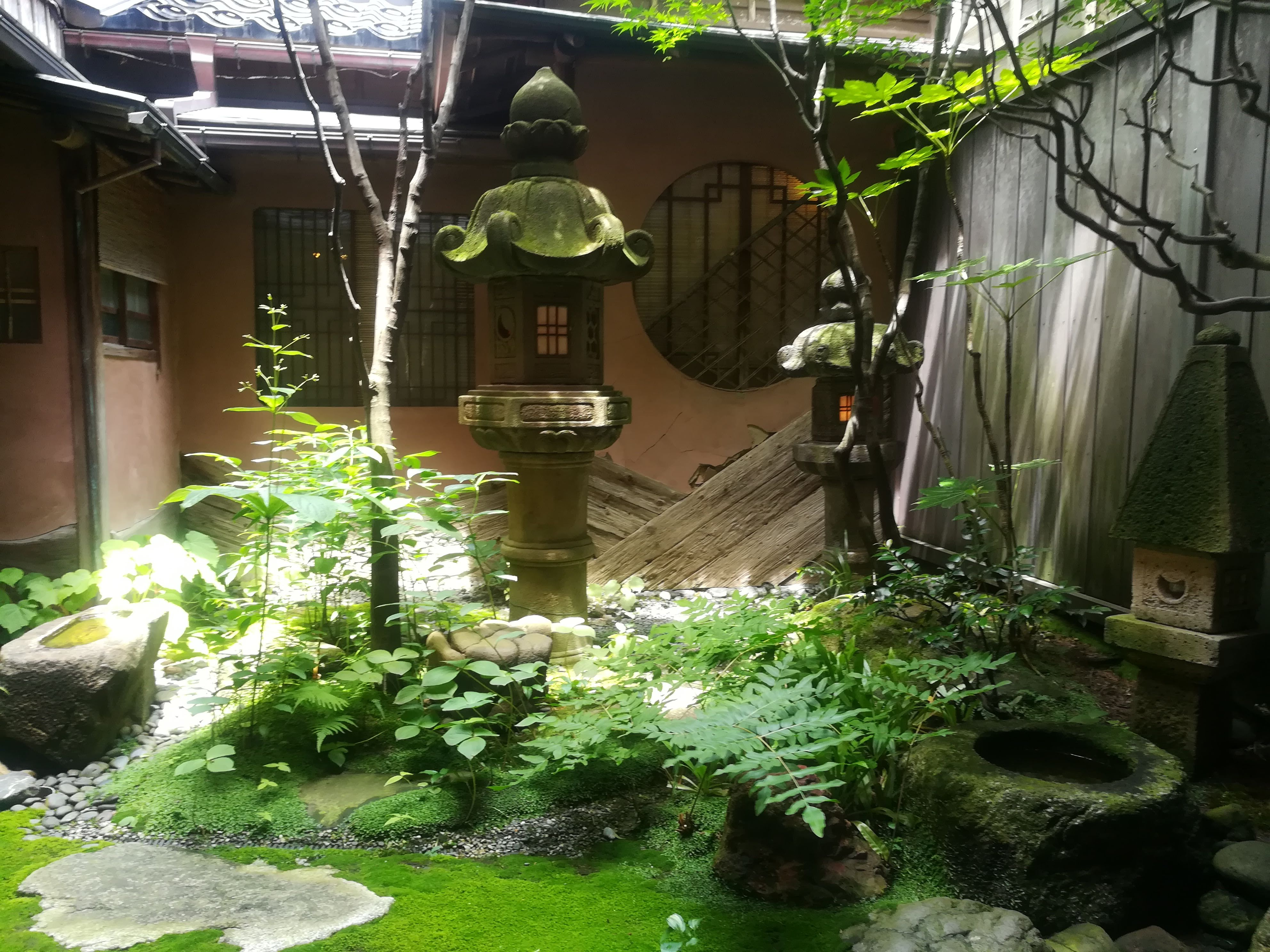
Straight-on view of the same garden. Note shitaji or renji windows, water basins, lanterns, and shade-loving plantings, including ferns, Soleirolia soleirolii, and a moss lawn.

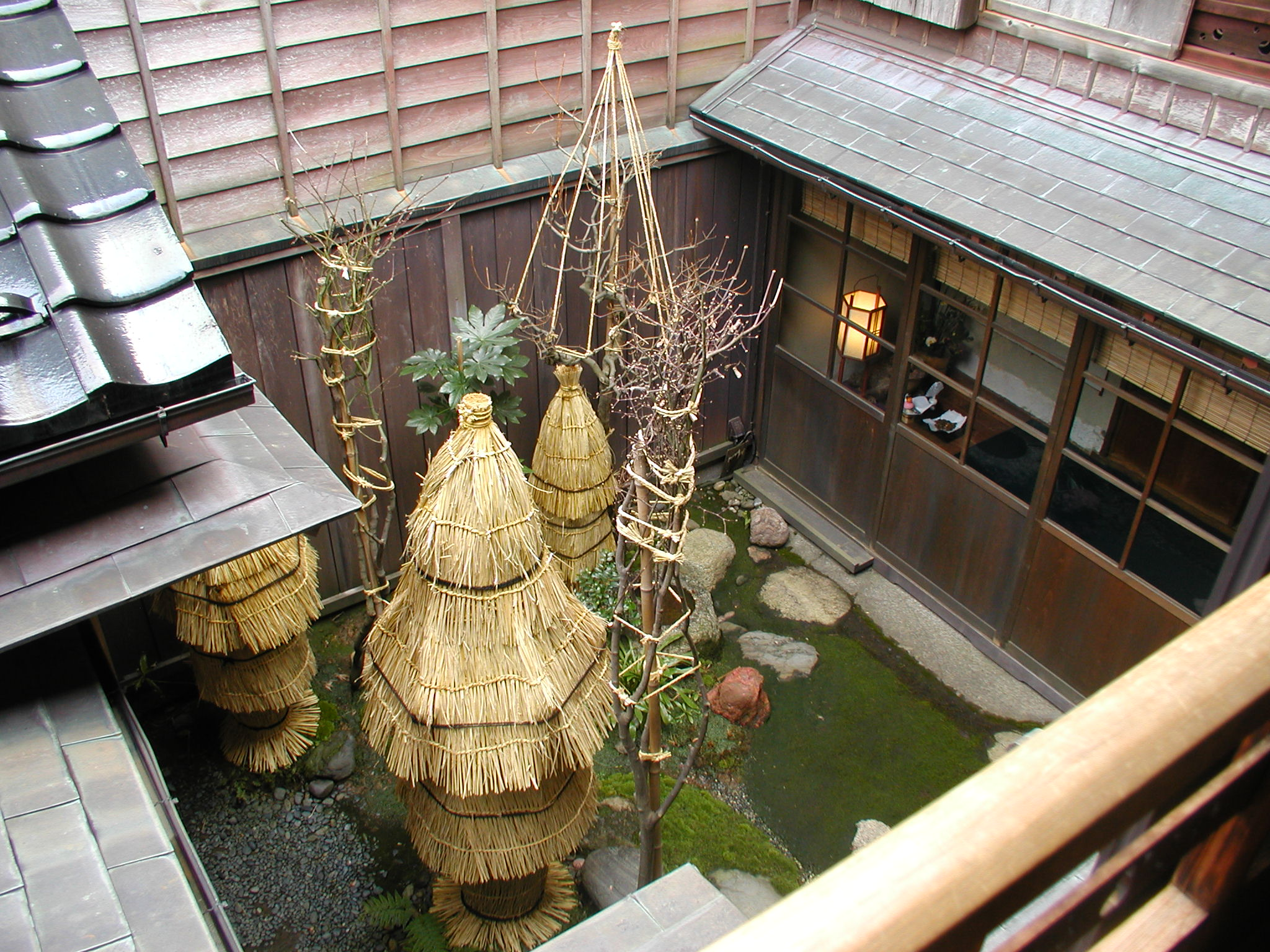
The courtyard garden of a former geisha house (okiya) in Kanazawa, Ishikawa. The trees are covered with straw to protect them from the snow.

A tsubo-niwa (坪庭/壷庭/つぼにわ) is a type of very small garden in Japan. Tsubo-niwa have been described as "quasi-indoor gardens", and are a key feature of some traditional Japanese homes, such as the machiya (lit. 'townhouse'). They are valued for their beauty and for bringing nature into the building.

Some tsubo-niwa are also impluviums that collect rainwater; others contain groundwater wells. They are traditional locations for temizu (handwashing). They also provide light and ventilation.

As the floorboards in a traditional Japanese building are usually raised above the ground, a niwa is an area without the wooden flooring; the floorboards surrounding a garden may form a veranda called an engawa.

== Etymology and terminology ==
The term tsuboniwa stems from tsubo (坪), a unit of measurement (equal to 1×1 ken, the size of two tatami (flooring and sleeping mats), roughly 3.3 square metres (36 sq ft)), and niwa, meaning "garden". Other spellings of tsubo-niwa translate to "container garden", and a tsubo-niwa may differ in size from the tsubo unit of measurement.

A number of different terms exist to describe the function of townhouse gardens. Courtyard gardens of all sizes are referred to as naka-niwa, "inner gardens"; gardens referred to as tōri-niwa (通り庭, lit. 'passage garden') include both the mise-niwa (shop entrance garden) and the hashiri-niwa (hallway-garden, often mostly-roofed and used as a kitchen). The zensai-niwa is found at the front of a traditional townhouse, with additional tsubo-niwa often found in the interior and at the rear.

== History ==
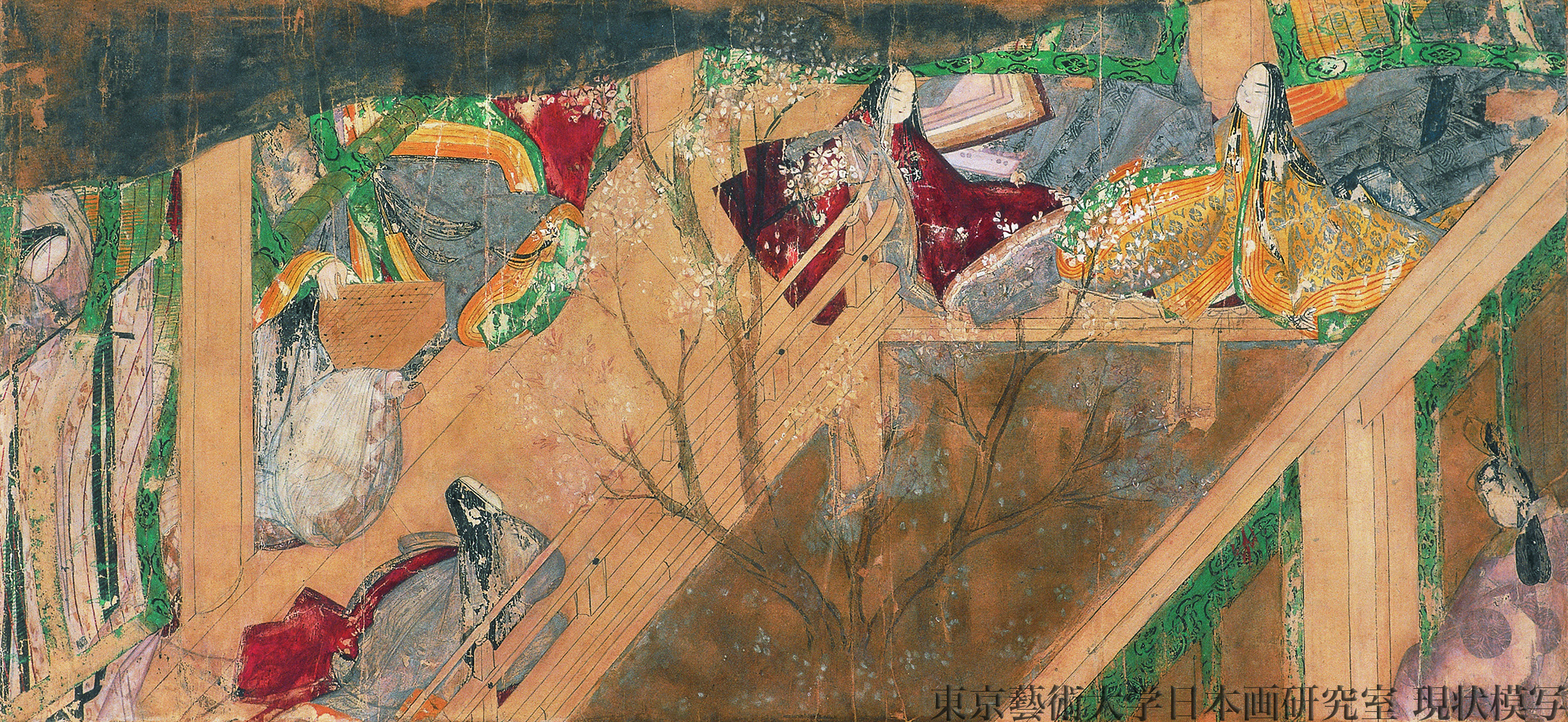
Courtiers around a tsubo-niwa, illustration from The Tale of Genji, Heian period (c. 1130)

Tsubo-niwa were originally found in the interior courtyards of Heian period palaces, designed to give a glimpse of nature and some privacy to the residents of the rear side of the building. These were as small as one tsubo – roughly 3.3 square metres (36 sq ft).

During the Edo period, merchants began building small gardens in the space between their shops – which faced the street – and their residences, located behind the shop. These tiny gardens were meant to be seen, but not entered, and usually featured a stone lantern, a water basin, stepping stones and a few plants, arranged in the cha-niwa (tea[house]-garden) style, which was fashionable.

Tsubo-niwa gained greater popularity in the early 21st century, and can be found in many Japanese residences, hotels, restaurants, and public buildings. Multistory and underground interior spaces present difficulties for tsubo-niwa cultivation; artificial lighting, anidolic lighting (using fiberoptic cables to pipe in sunlight), and a combination of both have been used.

A Kyoto machiya (merchant's house), structural model. Tsubo-niwa between shop space (right) and residence. This garden is literally one tsubo, two tatami, in area.

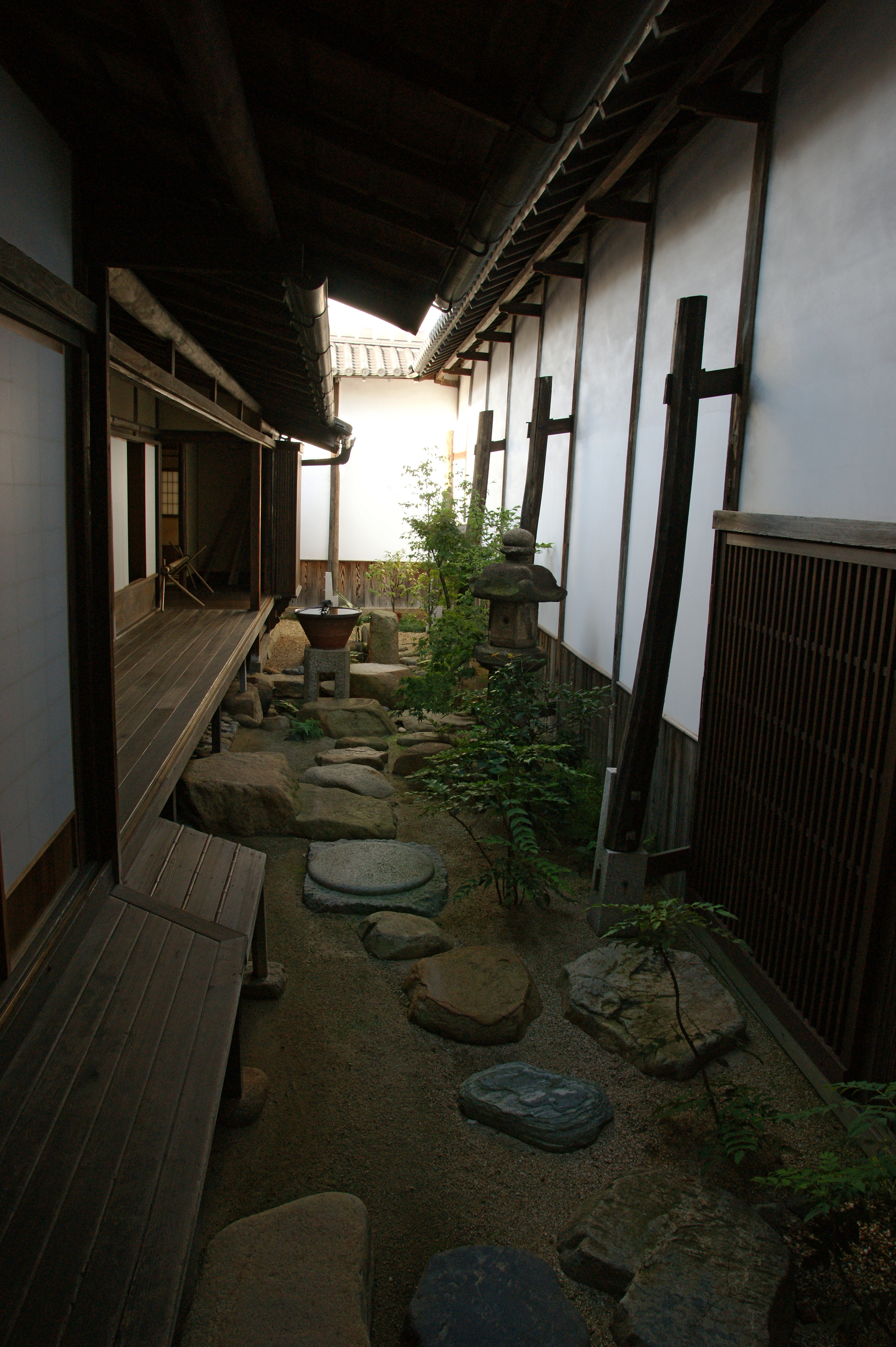
An Edo period tsubo-niwa with many stepping-stones

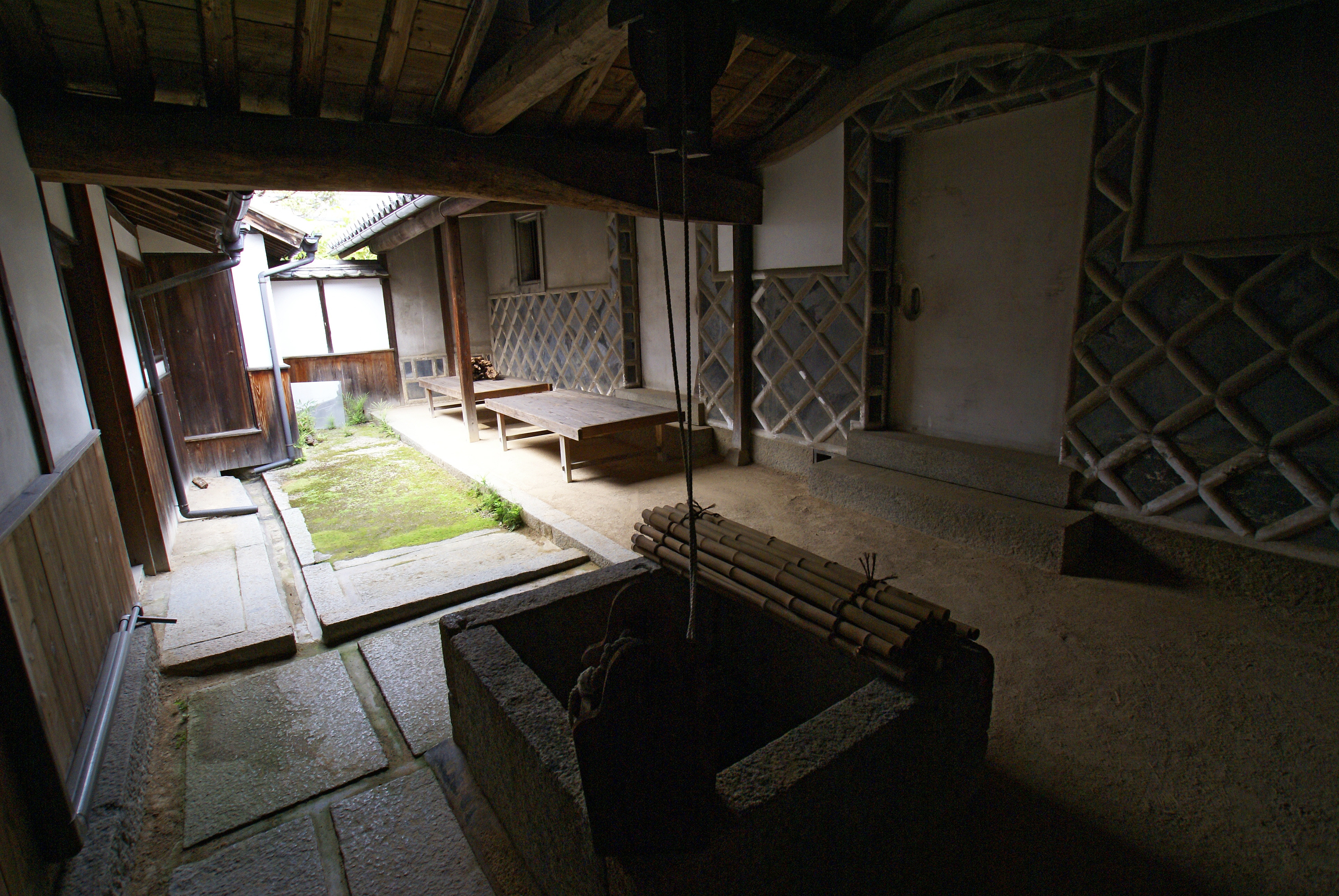
An Edo period tsubo-niwa, with a well in the foreground

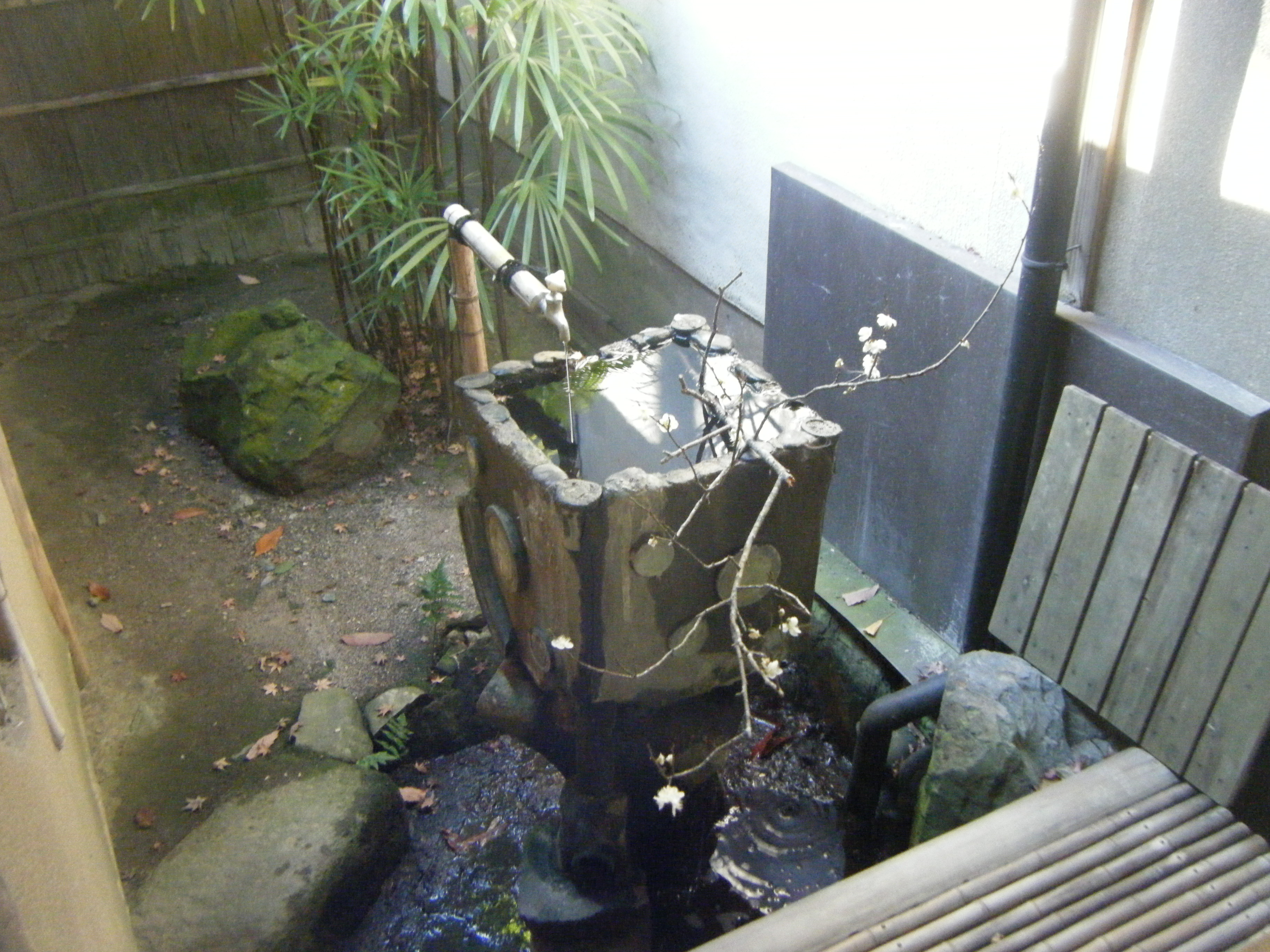
A 20th century functional tsubo-niwa; the well has been replaced by a tap. A roof gutter also drains here.

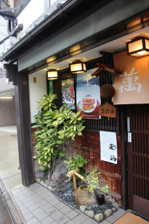
A zensai-niwa in Kyoto, 2013

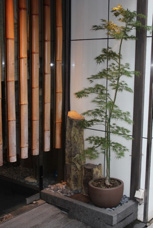
A modern mise-niwa; potted plant, columnar basalt, gravel

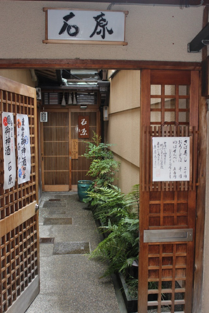
A tori-niwa in a historic machiya, 2013

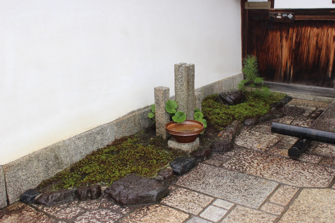
A tsubo-niwa with a moss lawn in a Kyoto temple

== Purpose ==
At night, with lit tōrō and moving shishi-odoshi

Tsubo-niwa are used to provide a touch of nature, connect the outdoors to the indoors, and make an indoor space seem larger; they can also act as light wells. Several tsubo-niwa are used to provide passive ventilation in an otherwise small home, allowing a breeze to blow through the living space (see tablinum). They may also contain a basin, traditionally used for temizu, hand-cleansing.

Tsubo-niwa are often set up where they can be seen by home occupants while relaxing or eating dinner. Commercial restaurants and eateries, such as ramen shops, may also have tsubo-niwa, placed so that guests can see them while eating. (Note: Account: Sketches:)

Tsubo-niwa use less space than larger gardens and are cheaper to build. As of 2012, The cost is in the low hundred thousand yen (low thousands of US dollars) for professional installation. Do-it-yourself kits cost a tenth as much and upwards. They also take less time to maintain; keeping a traditional Japanese garden is considered a meditative act.

== Contents ==
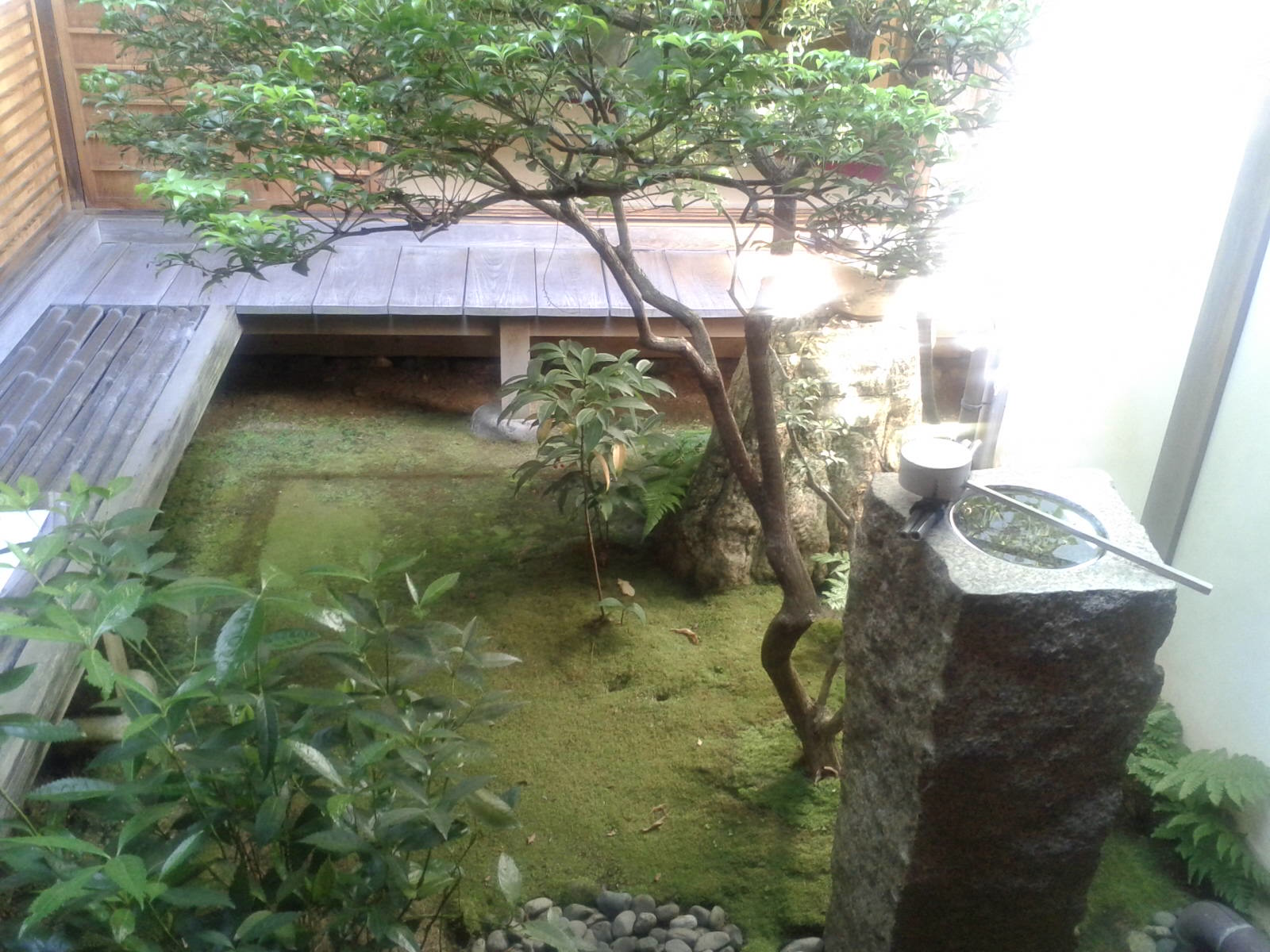
A shady tsubo-niwa with a moss lawn and a chōzu-bachi (手水鉢, lit. 'hand water basin'). The engawa on the left is a takesunoko-en, often used in wetter areas, as the bamboo sheds puddles well. There is no engawa on the right.

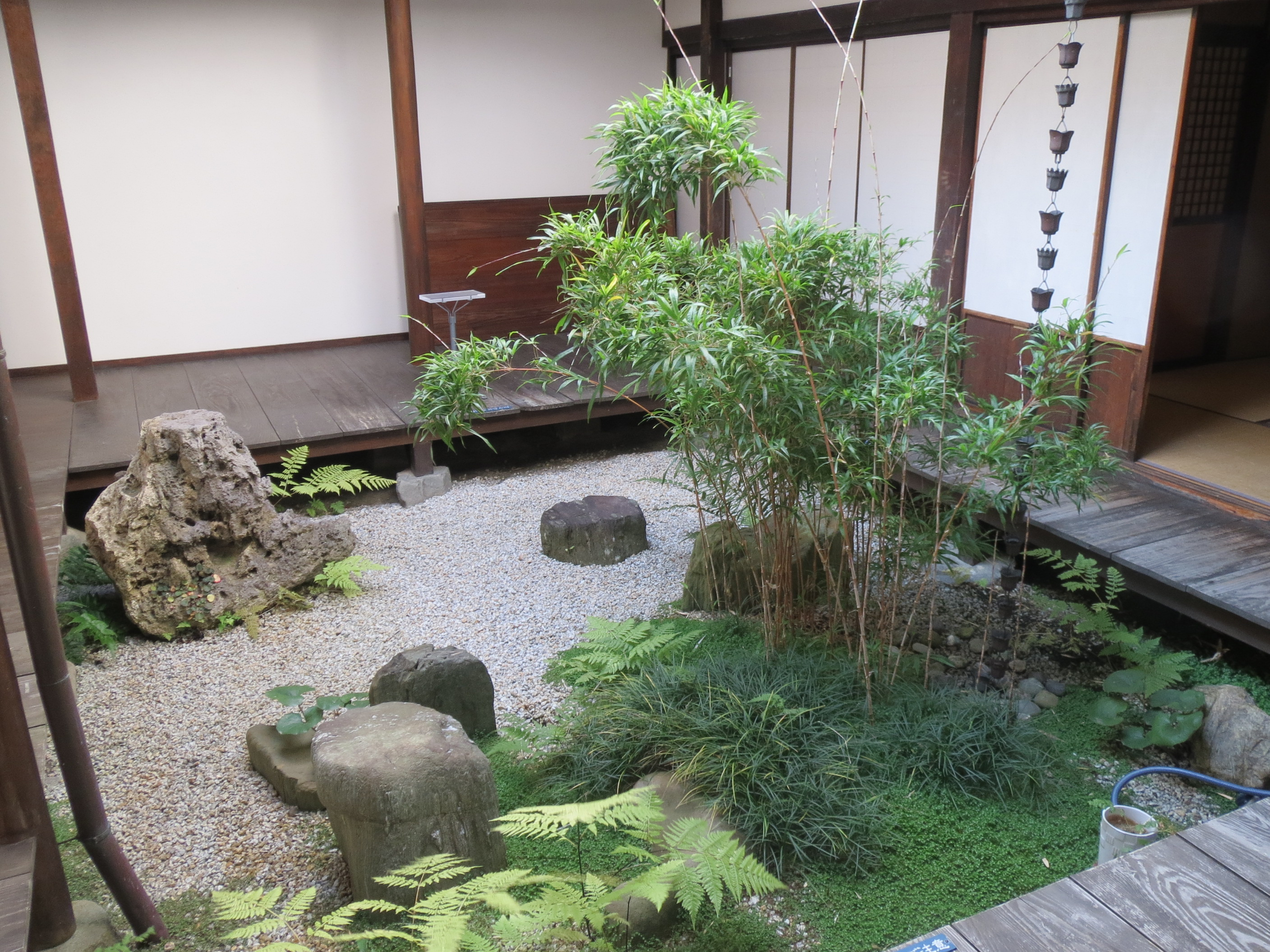
A garden surrounded by a low kirime-en. Pale gravel and feature stones (apparently pumice, sandstone, and columnar basalt), a rain chain, and a planting that grows in shade and moisture (bamboo, other grasses, ferns, and a creeping plant with small round leaves, probably Soleirolia soleirolii).

Tsubo-niwa typically contain a functional tōrō lantern and a chōzu-bachi (water basin), such as a tsukubai. They may also contain sculptures. Much of the area may be filled with gravel, set with larger stones, and carefully raked and kept free of weeds. Plants may be very minimal, and surrounded by stones, or the whole area may be covered with vegetation. Shade-loving plants are needed, as a narrow courtyard will seldom be in direct sunlight. Dwarf plants may also be used. A few stems of bamboo are common, but not ubiquitous. Artificial plants are also sometimes used.

== Famous tsubo-niwa ==
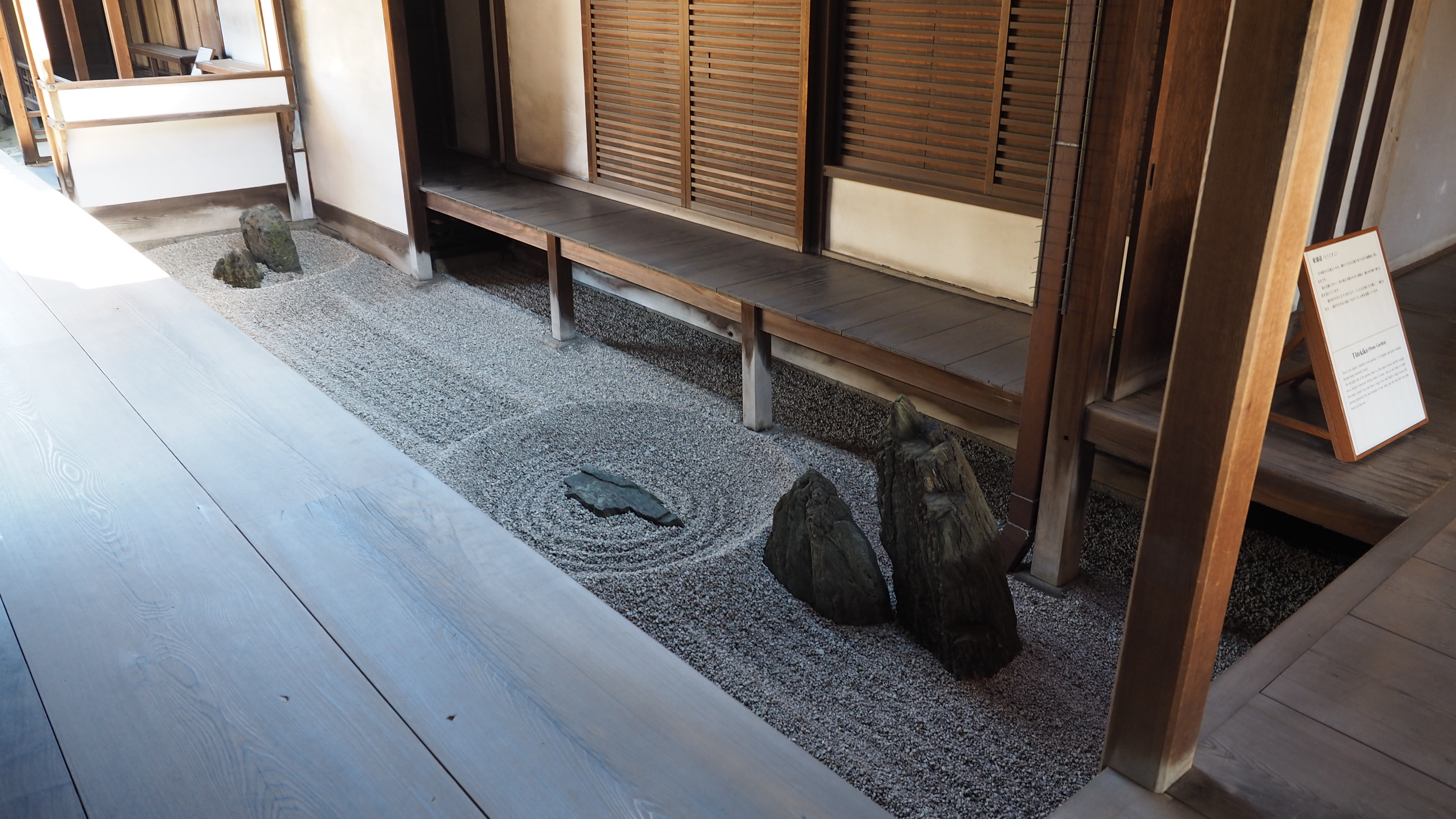
Totekiko, a famous tsubo-niwa garden, is in the karesansui style and does not use vegetation.

A good example of a tsubo-niwa from the Meiji period can be found in the villa of Murin-an in Kyoto. Totekiko is a famous courtyard garden using no vegetation at all.

== See also ==
- Tablinum – for the physics of ventilating and cooling using courts and gardens
