= Brenthurst Gardens =

Private gardens in Johannesburg, South Africa

Coordinates: 26°10′20″S 28°02′44″E

Brenthurst Gardens is a 45-acre (180,000 m^{2}) private garden in Johannesburg, South Africa attached to Brenthurst Estate, the residence of the Oppenheimer family, led by Nicky Oppenheimer.

== See also ==
- Around the World in 80 Gardens

=== Books and publications ===
- Smith, Alan Huw (1988). The Brenthurst gardens. Brenthurst Press. ISBN 0-909079-41-2. OCLC 20535590.
