= Tromsø University Museum =

Norwegian museum

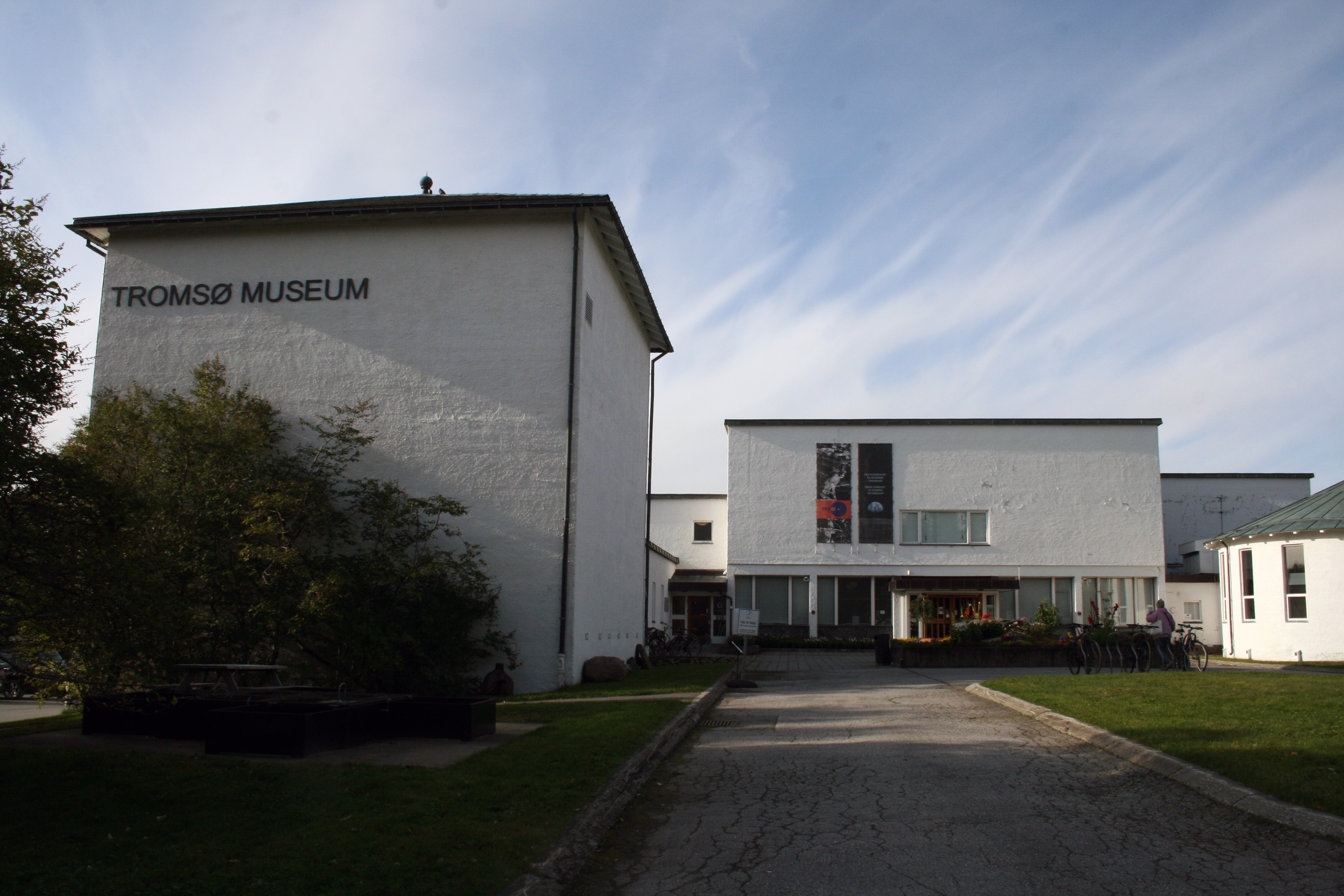
- The main Tromsø Museum facility
- Established: 1872
- Location: Tromsø, Troms, Norway
- Coordinates: 69.634858°N 18.912572°E
- Collection size: 2 million objects
- Visitors: 91,004 (2010)
- Director: Marit Anne Hauan
- Public transit access: Bus 37
- Website: https://uit.no/tmu

Tromsø University Museum (Norges arktiske universitetsmuseum) is a university museum located in Tromsø, Norway. Founded in 1872, it is one of the oldest scientific institutions in Northern Norway and has been part of the University of Tromsø since 1977. Initially established following a regional exhibition in 1870, the museum has grown from a small institution with limited professional staff to a cultural and research centre with a collection of about 2 million objects.

Throughout its history, the museum has specialized in natural sciences, archaeology, Sami culture, and Arctic research, with the "Samekulturen" exhibition on Sami culture being one of its most significant and long-running permanent exhibitions since 1973. The museum attracts more than 80,000 visitors annually and continues to serve as an important institution for both research and public education.

== Institutional structure ==
As an institution, the museum serves as both a multidisciplinary research institution and collection of four public display sites on Tromsøya:

- the main Tromsø Museum facility, at the southern end of the island, housing both permanent and temporary exhibitions (as well as the majority of employee offices, a library, and an archive)
- the Polar Museum, in the city centre, with a permanent exhibition on Arctic expeditions
- the M/S Polstjerna, a preserved seal hunting vessel, located south of the city centre
- the Arctic–Alpine Botanic Garden, near the main university campus at Breivika.

== History ==
=== Foundation and Early Years (1872–1918) ===
The idea of establishing a museum in Tromsø was first proposed in 1846 by the school teacher P. Schmidt, who wrote an article in the local newspaper advocating for a natural history museum. This initiative was inspired by Schmidt's collaboration with the marine biologist Michael Sars, who had requested his assistance in collecting specimens from northern marine fauna for the work "Fauna littoralis Norwegiae".

The opportunity to establish the museum came with a regional exhibition held in Tromsø in 1870. This exhibition showcased the region's assets, including geological maps by the geologist Karl Pettersen, whale skeletons, boat models, fishing equipment, and a collection of Sami artifacts. Following considerable effort, particularly by Pettersen, the Tromsø Museum was officially founded on 16 October 1872, with financial support from the King, the three northernmost Norwegian counties, and 148 other contributors.

During its early years, the museum operated with limited professional staff. Its first curator, the zoologist Hans Jacob Sparre Schneider, was appointed in 1877 and remained the key figure at the museum until his death in 1918. For many years, Schneider was the only full-time professional at the institution, occasionally overseeing sections beyond his expertise. The museum relied heavily on unpaid volunteer work from local teachers and academics who managed collections during their spare time.

=== Locations and development ===
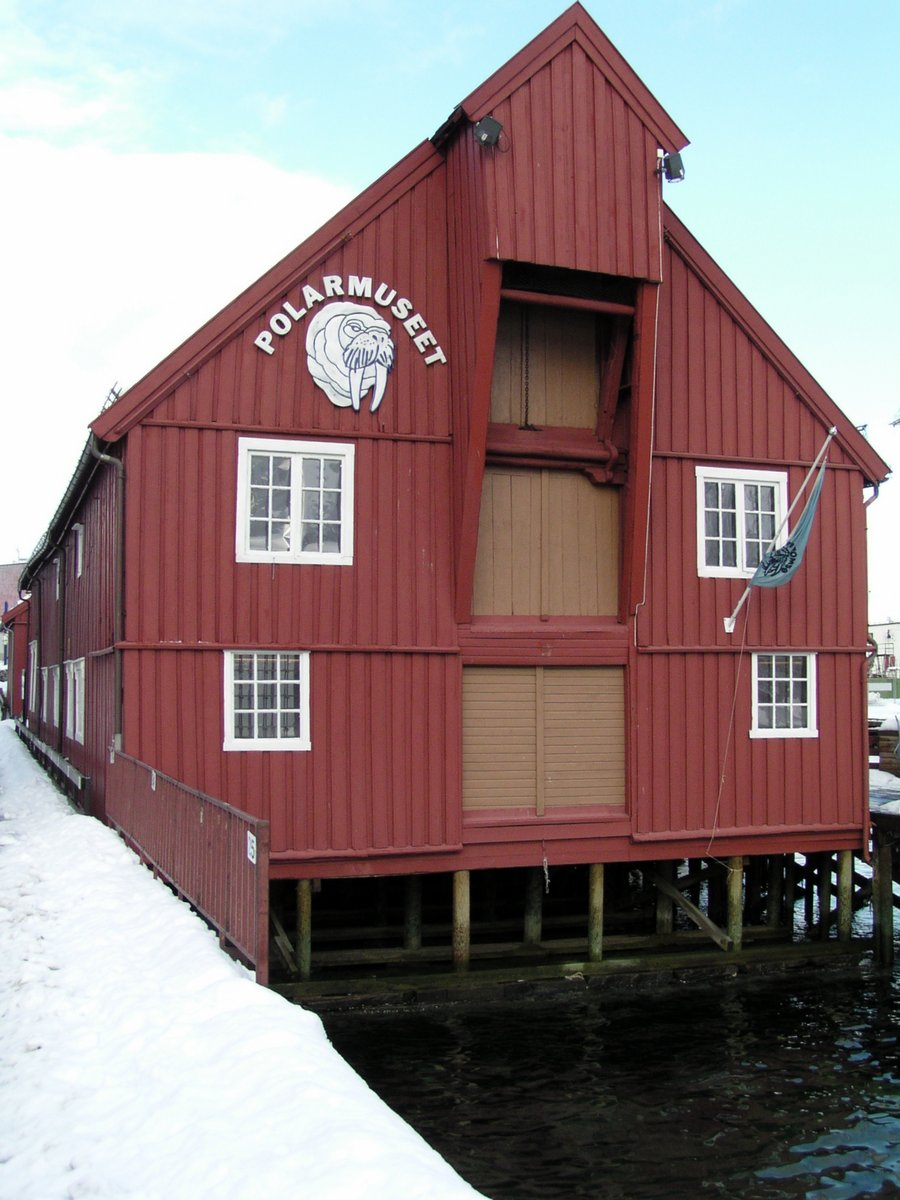
Polarmuseet

The museum has occupied three locations throughout its history. From 1874 to 1894, it rented two floors in the Baptist church in Tromsø, where all collections were displayed with limited opening hours (two hours every Sunday). In 1894, it moved to its own building—a fireproof, massive structure that was possibly the largest in Tromsø at the time, featuring 1,500 square metres across four floors. Since 1962, the museum has been housed in its current premises, separate from the main university campus.

=== Formal organization and growth ===
In 1886, the museum's collections were formally organized into five sections:

- The Finne section (Sami artifacts)
- The antiquities section
- zoology
- botany
- geology

In 1935, additional sections were added for biology-hydrography and cultural history.

The institution remained small and semi-professional for many decades. Significant expansion of staff and resources only occurred after World War II, with specialized curators hired for geology (1946), botany (1947), Sami ethnography (1949), and cultural history (1959). By 1961, the staff had grown from 8 employees in 1938 to 37.

The University Museum has four departments that are open to the public: Tromsø Museum on the south of the island, Polar Museum (Polarmuseet) in Tromsø city center, M/S Polstjerna at the south of town and the Arctic-Alpine Botanical Garden (Tromsø arktisk-alpine botaniske) at Breivika.

=== Incorporation into the university ===
The establishment of the University of Tromsø in the late 1960s significantly impacted the museum's role and identity. When Parliament formally decided to build Norway's fourth university in Tromsø in 1968, there were intense debates about the relationship between the existing museum and the new institution.

The museum advocated for the university to be built near its location to build upon existing research communities and avoid duplicating research environments. However, local authorities preferred a different site to redirect the town's expansion, and state authorities ultimately supported this alternative location.

As a result, instead of integrating the museum into new university departments, the entire museum was incorporated into the university as an institute for museum activities in 1977. This arrangement has preserved the museum's separate identity while making it an official part of the university structure.

== Status ==
As of 2006, the Tromsø University Museum had about 70 staff members and attracted 80,000–90,000 visitors annually. While the rest of the university has been consolidated at a single campus, the museum remains at its 1962 location. The museum has historically focused on several key research areas:

- Natural sciences: Including zoology, botany, and geology, with particular emphasis on Arctic and northern Norwegian species and formations.
- Archaeology: The antiquities collection became one of the museum's most important through the work of O.M. Nicolaysen from 1880 to 1924, who despite lacking formal archaeological training, conducted numerous excavations and registrations. In 1905, the museum was given responsibility for most of northern Norway's archaeological heritage.
- Sami culture: The Sami collection has been significant since the museum's founding, with major contributions made by Just Qvigstad, who managed the collection from 1884 to 1931 and made fundamental contributions to the study of Sami language and culture.
- Arctic Research: Given Tromsø's historical role as a "gateway to the Arctic" and a departure point for many polar expeditions, the museum has maintained collections and research related to Arctic exploration and environments.

== Main Tromsø Museum facility ==
As well as rotating temporary exhibits, this museum hosts a variety of permanent exhibitions featuring both natural and social science:

- "TellUs - from stardust to modern technology" (2019) provides a geological history of the planet and the local region
- The "UnNaturally" exhibit (2015) showcases Arctic wildlife and human interaction with nature
- "Under the lights" (2020) explores Northern Lights research
- "Dig a grave, bury a boat" (2021) is a small permanent exhibition on Viking boat graves in Northern Norway
- "Ecclastastical Art" (2014) is a two-gallery exhibition of religious art from the region
- "Sápmi - becoming a nation" (2000) tells the story of the modern political and cultural history of the Sámi people.

=== The Samekulturen exhibition ===
A milestone in the museum's history was the opening of the permanent exhibition "Samekulturen" (The Sámi Culture) on June 15, 1973. Produced by Professor Ørnulv Vorren with financial support from the Norwegian Arts Council and Research Council, this exhibition has served as an arena for the dissemination of Sámi culture for over four decades. Its development was influenced by Vorren's museum fact-finding missions abroad and Ernst Manker's exhibition at the Nordic Museum of Stockholm. The Sámi artist Iver Jåks (1932–2007) played a key role in creating the exhibition's visual character, receiving a scholarship from 1967 to 1972 to illustrate Samekulturen. Several Sámi academics were also involved in collecting materials and organizing the museum's educational programs, including individuals who later became prominent in Sámi cultural and political institutions.

The exhibition presents Sami culture thematically, focusing primarily on livelihood (particularly reindeer nomadism), handicraft, and pre-Christian religion. It begins by mapping the Sami territory and includes over 900 objects arranged in typologies and series. During the 1990s, parts of the exhibition were updated to include focus on Sámi political life, and in 2000, a complementary exhibition titled "Sápmi - en nasjon blir til" (Sápmi - Becoming a nation) opened alongside it. Today, Samekulturen remains both an historical document of museological practices and a resource for the revitalization of Sámi material culture and identity, with visitors regularly studying the exhibition's artifacts to reclaim traditional knowledge and techniques.

In 2024, a new component entitled "Rávdnji – the Strong Current" was added to explore Sámi heritage in Tromsø.

== Publications ==
From its early years, the museum has emphasized both public education and research. It published a yearly "årsberetning" (annual report) and the scientific series "Tromsø Museums Aarshefter" from 1878 to 1951, later followed by other publication series featuring work by both museum staff and external contributors. In 1957, Ørnulv Vorren and Ernst Manker published the book "Samekulturen" (Lapp Life and Customs, English edition 1962), which became an important foundation for the exhibition that later bore the same name.

== See also ==
- Arctic-alpine botanic garden
