= Monty Don's Paradise Gardens =

UK television series

- Genre: Documentary; Adventure travel
- Starring: Monty Don
- No. of episodes: 2

Production
- Producer: BBC
- Running time: 2 × 1 hour

Original release
- Network: BBC Two

Monty Don's Paradise Gardens is a television series of 2 programmes in which British gardener and broadcaster Monty Don travels across the Islamic world and beyond in search of paradise gardens and considering their place in the Quran. A book based on the series, Paradise Gardens: The World's Most Beautiful Islamic Gardens, was also published.

== See also ==
- Around the World in 80 Gardens
- Monty Don's French Gardens
- Monty Don's Italian Gardens
