= Monty Don's Italian Gardens =

British documentary television series

- Genre: Documentary; Adventure travel
- Directed by: Patti Kraus
- Starring: Monty Don
- No. of episodes: 4

Production
- Producer: BBC
- Running time: 4 × 1 hour

Original release
- Network: BBC Two

Monty Don's Italian Gardens is a television series of 4 programmes in which British gardener and broadcaster Monty Don visits several of Italy's most celebrated gardens.

Steve Wilson composed the title and theme music on the series. A book based on the series, Great Gardens of Italy, was also published.

== Gardens ==
Ep.	Country	Garden	Notes
1.	Italy	Villa Farnese, Caprarola	The gardens of the villa are as impressive as the building itself, a significant example of the Italian Renaissance garden period.
1.	Italy	Villa Adriana, Tivoli	The remains of the garden set out for Roman Emperor Hadrian around his palace.
1.	Italy	Villa d'Este, Tivoli	A spectacular Renaissance garden with many fountains. Website
1.	Italy	Borghese gardens, Rome	Public city garden, briefly mentioned
1.	Italy	Sacro Bosco, Bomarzo	a Mannerist monumental complex, populated by grotesque sculptures and small buildings located among the natural vegetation
1.	Italy	Villa Aldobrandini, Frascati	To provide water for the Teatro delle Acque ("Water Theater") of the garden, Aldobrandini constructed a new 8 kilometres (5 mi) long aqueduct
2.	Italy	Villa di Castello, Florence	the country residence of Cosimo I de' Medici, Grand Duke of Tuscany, these gardens had a profound influence upon the design of the Italian Renaissance garden and the later French formal garden.
2.	Italy	Boboli Gardens, Florence	a historical park of the city of Florence that was opened to the public in 1766, representing one of the first and most important examples of the "Italian Garden", which later served as inspiration for many European courts.
2.	Italy	Villa Gamberaia, Florence	characterized now by its eighteenth-century terraced garden, that Don calls "enormously influential"
2.	Italy	Villa I Tatti, Florence	Cecil Pinsent's first Italian Garden, influencing the notion Renaissance gardens were devoid of color except green
2.	Italy	La Foce, Val d'Orcia	Cecil Pinsent's last Italian Garden, which Don considers "perhaps his greatest"
3.	Italy	Torrecchia Vecchia, Cisterna di Latina	notable English-style gardens
3.	Italy	Royal Palace of Caserta, Caserta	The 120 ha garden is a typical example of the baroque extension of formal vistas
3.	Italy	Villa il Tritone, Sorrento	private garden website
3.	Italy	a terraced lemon field, Amalfi	
3.	Italy	Villa Cimbrone, Ravello	Gardens visited by Virginia Woolf, Vita Sackville-West, T. S. Eliot, and most famously, Greta Garbo. Now a hotel website
3.	Italy	La Mortella, Ischia	a spectacular subtropical and Mediterranean garden developed since 1956 by the late Susana Walton Website
3.	Italy	an example of "urban farming" in Naples	
3.	Italy	Garden of Ninfa, Cisterna di Latina	called "the most romantic garden in the world"
4.	Italy	Orto botanico di Padova, Padua	One of the world's oldest academic botanical gardens
4.	Italy	Villa Pisani, Stra	Monte gets lost in the maze of "the Queen" of the world famous venetian gardens, Villa Pisani
4.	Italy	Villa Marlia, Lucca	
4.	Italy	Lake Como	Don takes a boat trip with Judith Wade, founder of Grandi Giardini Italiani
4.	Italy	Villa Melzi d'Eril, Bellagio	website
4.	Italy	Ingegnoli, Milan	One of Italy's oldest nurseries
4.	Italy	Isola Bella, Lake Maggiore	"a tipsy drag queen of a garden ready to party all night long and the next day too"

== See also ==
- Around the World in 80 Gardens
- Monty Don's French Gardens
- Monty Don's Paradise Gardens
