= Totekiko =

Garden in Kyoto Prefecture, Japan

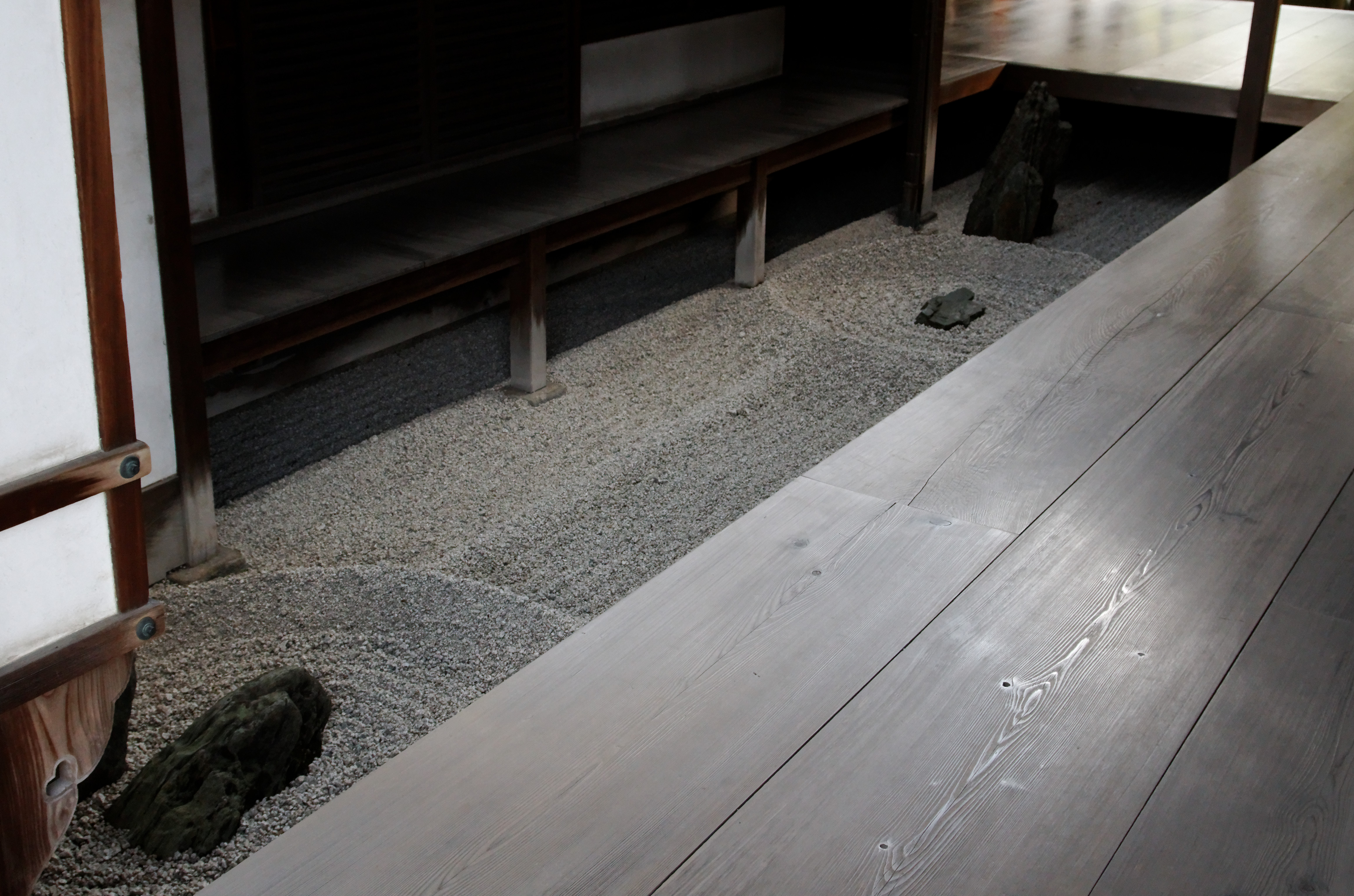

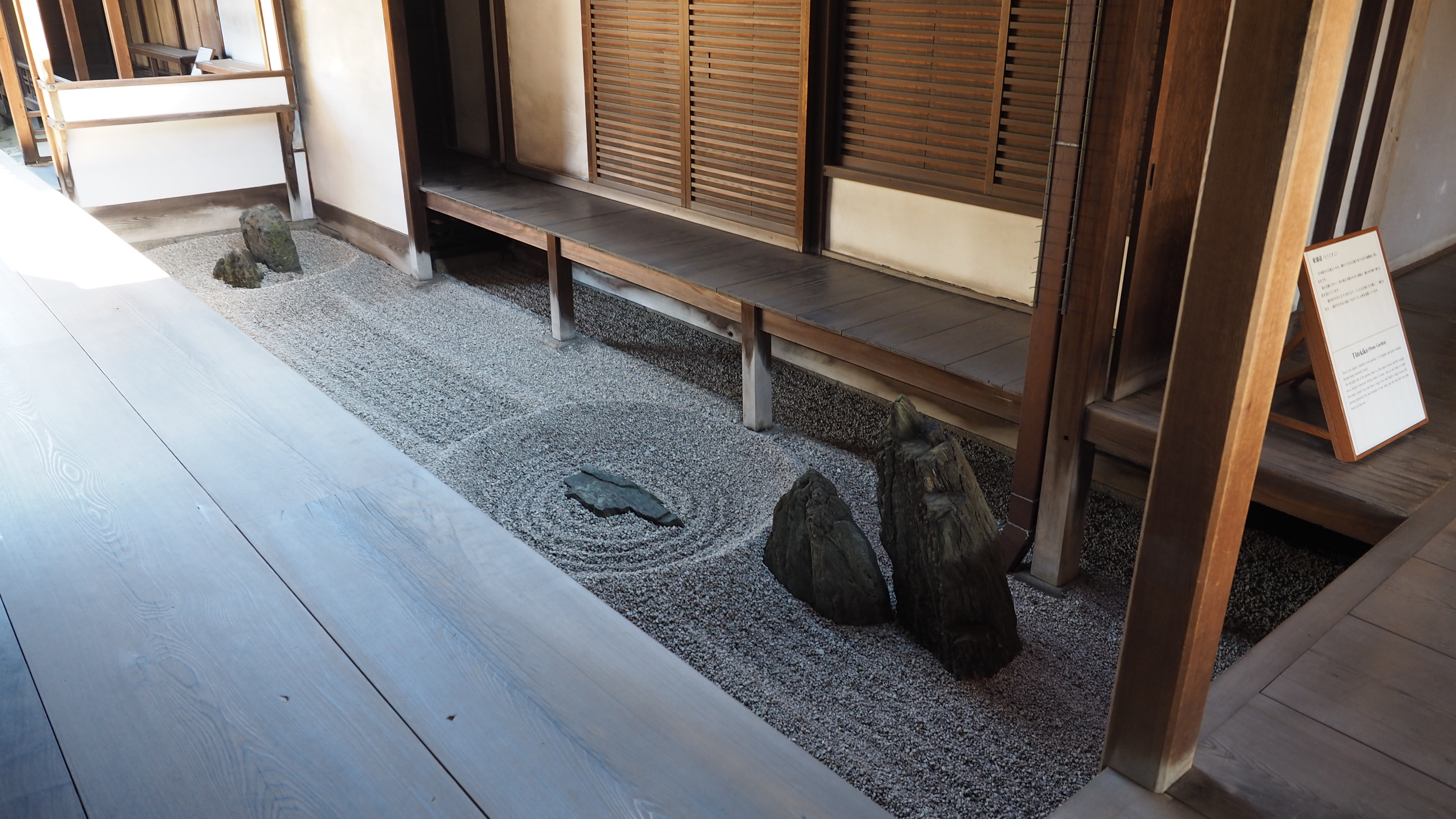

Tōtekiko (東滴壺) is one of the five gardens at the Ryōgen-in sub-temple of the Daitoku-ji Buddhist complex in Kita-ku, Kyoto, Japan. It was laid out by Nabeshima Gakusho in 1958, and is claimed to be the smallest Japanese rock garden.

It is a tsubo-niwa, a small enclosed garden, composed of rocks placed on raked sand. Concentric gravel circles around stones placed towards each end of the garden are connected by parallel ridges and furrows. The garden is briefly illuminated by the sun at around noon each day, and it is occasionally covered by snow in the winter. The garden symbolises a Zen saying, that the harder a stone is thrown in, the bigger the ripples.

The temple also includes three other karesansui gardens: Isshi-dan, Koda-tei, and Ryōgin-tei (a moss-covered garden which is claimed to be the oldest garden in Daitoku-ji, and has been attributed to Sōami).
