= Made Wijaya =

Australian landscape gardener (1953–2016)

- Born: Michael White; 22 March 1953; Sydney, Australia
- Died: 28 August 2016 (aged 63); Sydney, Australia
- Occupation: landscape gardener
- Known for: tropical garden designs in Southeast Asia
- Notable work: Tropical Garden Design 1999, At Home in Bali 2000, Modern Tropical Garden Design 2007, Architecture of Bali 2011

Made Wijaya (22 March 1953 – 28 August 2016) was an Australian landscape gardener who was based in Bali.

He was a recognized tropical garden designer known for his work across the island. His professional interests spanned art, design, photography, videography, landscape design, history, journalism, and anthropology.[

In 1973 Made Wijaya (born Michael White) sailed to Bali on a break from architectural studies. When the ketch encountered difficulties landing in rough seas, Made jumped overboard to swim ashore.

His break became permanent as he settled in Bali, living with a Brahmin family who informally adopted him. He regularly visited members of Balinese royal families and learned about the island's rituals and history, "gaining an almost encyclopaedic knowledge of the island that rivalled that of many Balinese". He also became fluent in Balinese. In 1975, he was given the name Made Wijaya by a priest during a temple ceremony.

== Career ==
As an NSW tennis champion he initially coached tennis and English to the Balinese. He later started writing a column in The Sunday Bali Post, Stranger in Paradise: Diary of an Expatriate, in which he wrote about Balinese culture.

He subsequently focused on architecture and garden design, making tropical garden design his principal professional activity.

His first major project was redesigning the Bali Hyatt Hotel in Sanur, followed by the work on the Oberoi in Seminyak, a new resort designed by Australian architect Peter Muller. He saw the garden as theatre and created vistas with tropical shrubs and creepers flowing from one specimen of classical sculpture to another.

Wijaya went on to create more than 600 tropical gardens in Southeast Asia and around the world, including David Bowie's garden on the island of Mustique and the Naples Botanical Garden in Florida.
