= Ryōgen-in =

Buddhist subtemple in Kyoto, Japan

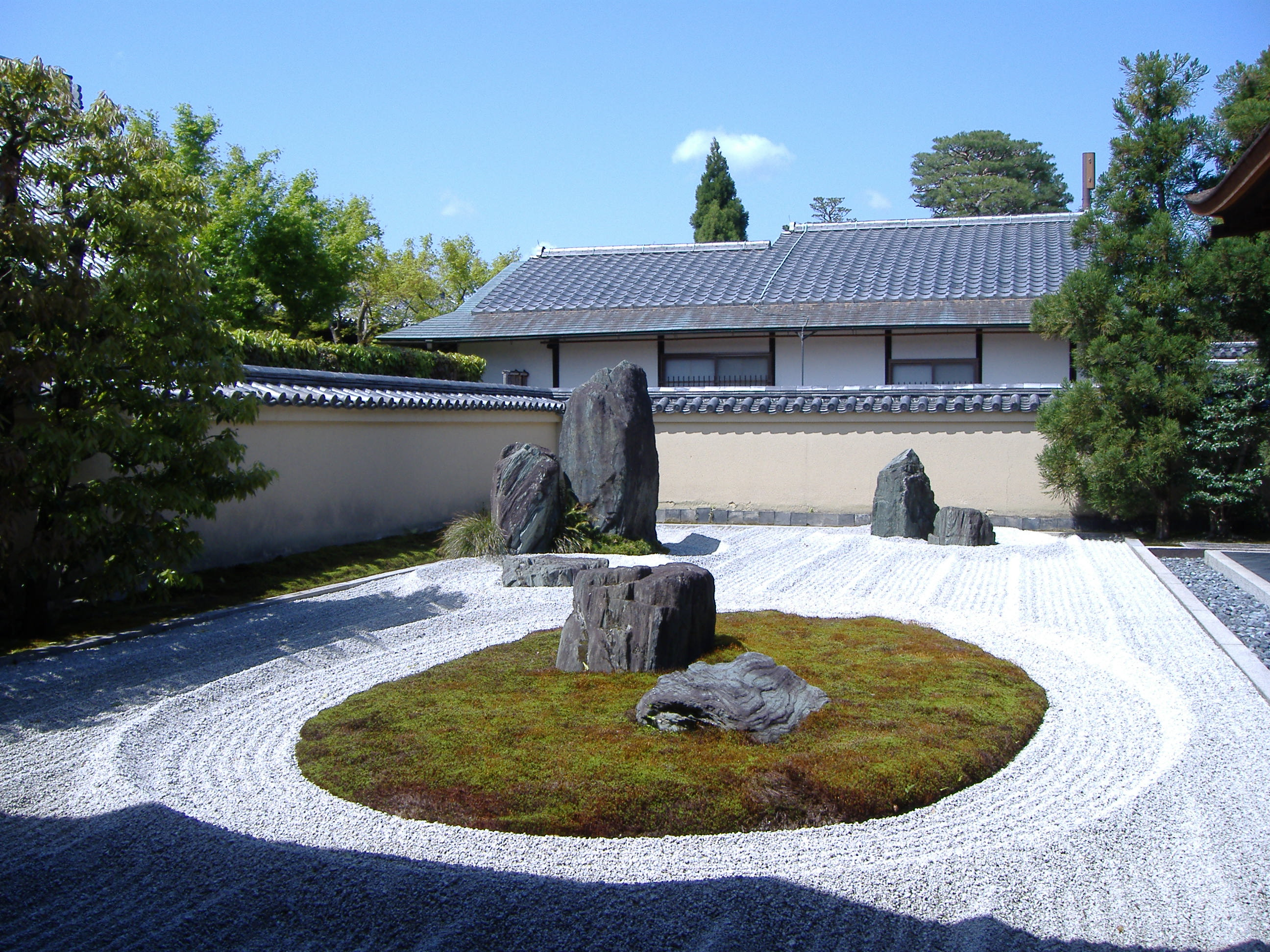
Ryogen-in

Ryōgen-in (龍源院) is a subtemple of the Daitoku-ji Buddhist complex, located in Kita-ku, Kyoto, Japan. It was constructed in 1502.

There are five gardens adjoining the abbot's residence, including Totekiko (claimed to be the smallest Japanese rock garden), Isshi-dan, Koda-tei, and Ryogin-tei (a moss-covered garden which is claimed to be the oldest garden in Daitoku-ji, and has been attributed to Sōami).

== See also ==
- List of National Treasures of Japan (temples)
