= Jacques Wirtz =

Belgian landscape architect (1924–2018)

Jacques Wirtz (31 December 1924 – 21 July 2018) was a Belgian landscape architect.

Wirtz was born in Schoten, a suburb of Antwerp. His family were stockbrokers. He studied landscape architecture at a horticultural school in Vilvoorde. He was forced to work in a nursery in Germany during the Second World War. He started his own business in 1950, as garden designer and later landscape architect. He has four children. His sons Martin (born 1963) and Peter (born 1961) joined the firm in 1990. It is the largest landscape design business in Belgium.

Wirtz is particularly noted for his use of evergreens clipped to create undulating "clouds" of foliage, creating a green architecture that lasts all year, together with a retrained palette of herbaceous planting. He believed that his gardens should preserve and enhance the spirit of place, rather than stamping his own mark on the landscape.

He came to public notice after being commissioned to design the garden for the Belgian pavilion at Expo '70 in Osaka. Perhaps his largest public commission was the redesigned Carrousel Garden (jardin du Carrousel) in the Tuileries Gardens in Paris, a long-running project which started in 1990 and was completed in 2004. President Mitterrand also asked him to redesign the gardens at the Élysée Palace (1992). In addition to many small and large gardens for industrial or domestic settings, his firm has designed gardens in Belgium at Cogels Park in Schoten (1977), the campus of Antwerp University (1978), Bremweide Park in Antwerp (1978), for the Belgian headquarters of BMW at Bornemat (1985), a garden running down the centre of Albert II Boulevard in Brussels (1992), and gardens at the Château De Groote Mot in Borgloon (1994), part of the garden at Hex Castle in Heers (1995), and the garden at the Château de Vinderhoute (1997); in Luxembourg, for the Banque de Luxembourg (1996) and Banque Générale du Luxembourg (1997); and the renovated garden at Alnwick Castle (2001), and Jubilee Park in Canary Wharf in England.

He received the Golden Medal of the Royal Flemish Academy of Belgium for Science and the Arts in 2006, when he was compared with André Le Nôtre, William Kent, and Lancelot “Capability” Brown.

Wirtz died on 21 July 2018.
