= Monty Don =

English horticulturist, broadcaster, and writer (born 1955)

Monty Don OBE DL VMH
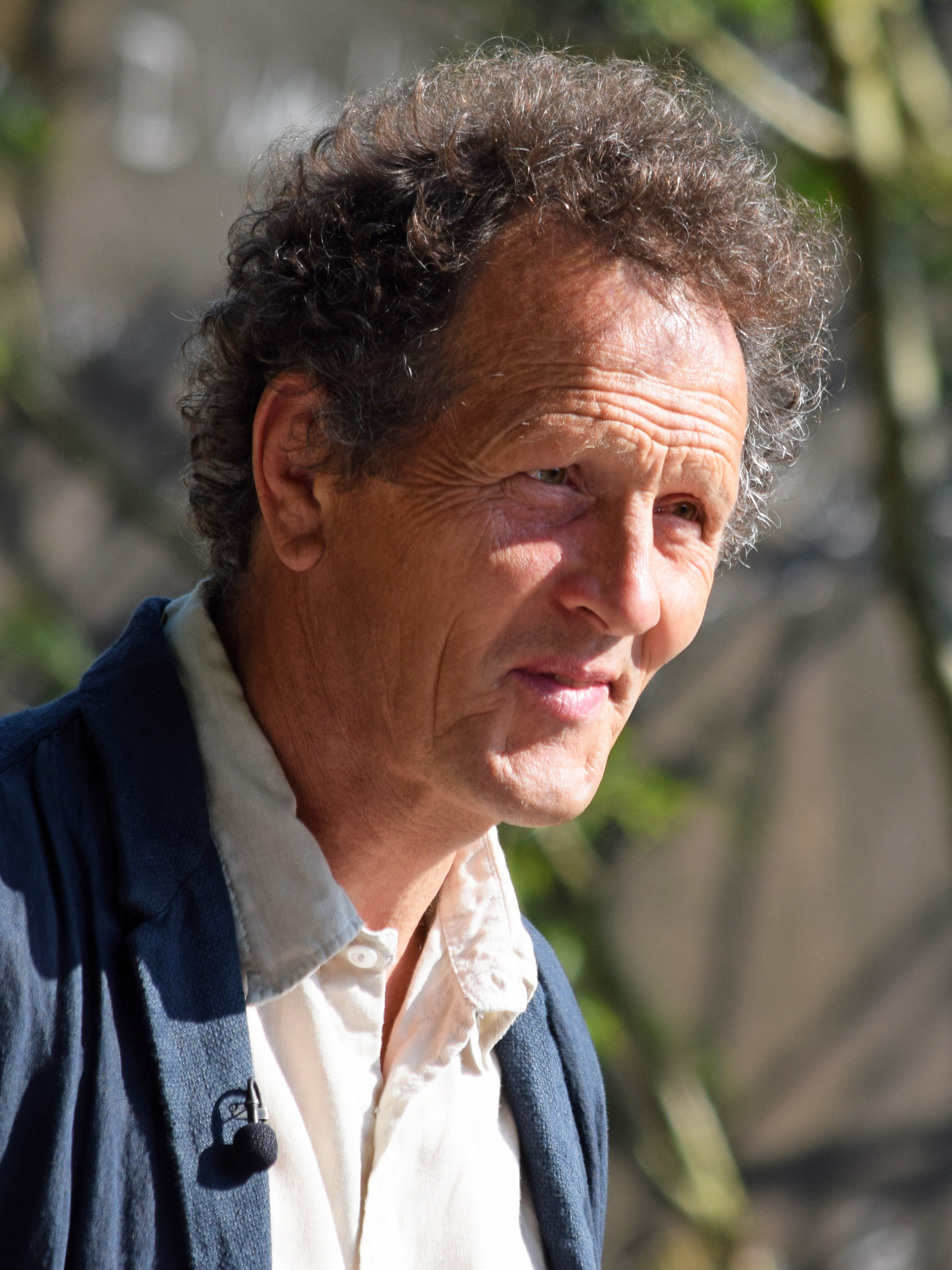
- Don in 2017
- Born: George Montagu Don; 8 July 1955 (age 71); Iserlohn, West Germany
- Education: Malvern College; Vyne School; Queen Mary's College, Basingstoke; University of Cambridge
- Occupations: Horticulturist; broadcaster; writer
- Years active: 1989–present
- Television: Gardeners' World
- Spouse: Sarah Erskine (m. 1983)
- Children: 3
- Relatives: George Don; David Don
- Website: montydon.com

Montagu Denis Wyatt Don (born George Montagu Don; 8 July 1955) OBE DL VMH is an English horticulturist, broadcaster, and writer who is best known as the lead presenter of the BBC gardening television series Gardeners' World from 2011 to 2026.

Born in Germany and raised in England, Don was educated at the University of Cambridge, during which time he met his future wife. They ran a successful costume jewellery business through the 1980s until the stock market crash of 1987 resulted in almost complete bankruptcy. In 1989, Don made his television debut as a regular on This Morning with a gardening segment, which led to further television work across the decade including his own shows for BBC Television and Channel 4. He began his writing career at this time and published his first of over 25 books in 1990. Between 1994 and 2006, Don wrote a weekly gardening column in The Observer.

In 2003, Don replaced Alan Titchmarsh, at the latter's suggestion, as the lead presenter of Gardeners' World, only leaving the show between 2008 and 2011 owing to illness, before his eventual retirement from the role in 2026. He also has written and produced several garden series of his own, the most recent being Monty Don's Rhineland Gardens which aired in 2026.

== Early life and education ==
George Montagu Don was born on 8 July 1955 in Iserlohn, West Germany. He is the youngest of five children to British parents Denis Thomas Keiller Don, a career soldier stationed in Germany at the time of his birth, and (née) Janet Montagu Wyatt. Soon after Don's birth, his parents changed the name on his birth certificate to Montagu Denis Don because of a family spat over the name. When Don was 10, he added his mother's maiden name, becoming Montagu Denis Wyatt Don.

On Don's paternal side he is a descendant of botanist George Don and the Keiller family, best known as the inventors of Keiller's marmalade. On his maternal side, he is descended from the Wyatt family of architects. Don has a twin sister, Alison, who at the age of 19 was nearly killed in a car accident, suffering a broken neck and blindness.

When Don was one year old, the family moved to Hampshire, England. He described his parents as "very strict". He was educated at three private schools: Quidhampton School in Basingstoke, followed by Bigshotte School in Wokingham, where at seven, he was asked to leave school for being too boisterous. He then attended Malvern College in Malvern, which he hated, followed by a state comprehensive school, the Vyne School, and a state sixth form college, Queen Mary's College, Basingstoke. He failed his A-levels and while studying for retakes at night school, worked on a building site and a pig farm by day. During his childhood, he had become an avid gardener and farmer.

In his late teens, Don spent several months in Aix-en-Provence, France where he worked as a gardener and played rugby in local teams. He returned to England, determined to attend the University of Cambridge out of "sheer bloody-mindedness", and passed the entrance exams. He studied English at Magdalene College, Cambridge, during which time he met his future wife Sarah Erskine, a trained jeweller and architect. Don took up boxing to impress his father, a former heavyweight boxing champion in the army, becoming a Cambridge Half Blue for boxing. He gave up after getting knocked out and suffering concussion.

== Career ==
=== Jewellery business ===
In 1981, Don and Erskine started Monty Don Jewellery, a London-based business that designed, made, and sold costume jewellery. The company became a success and in five years, operated from a shop on Beauchamp Place in Knightsbridge with hundreds of outworkers and had secured as many as 60 outlets across the UK, including Harrods, Harvey Nichols, and Liberty. Among their customers were Boy George, Michael Jackson, and Princess Diana. However, the 1987 stock market crash caused an almost complete bankruptcy as it cut off American sales, their biggest market.

The situation prompted Don to embark on a career in writing and broadcasting. Reflecting on the experience, he wrote: "We were lambs to the slaughter and we lost everything, [...] we lost our house, our business. We sold every stick of furniture we had at Leominster market". He was unemployed from 1991 to 1993, and spent all of 1992 on the dole. Some of their jewellery is kept at the V&A Museum.

=== Television ===
==== Early career ====
By mid-1989, Don had written several gardening articles and his home garden was featured in various publications. The increased exposure opened doors: soon Don was writing a gardening column for the Mail on Sunday, had a book deal, and an invitation to screen test for a proposed weekly live gardening segment on the ITV television breakfast show This Morning. Don landed the spot and his first segment aired in October 1989, receiving £100 a show.

After 26 spots on This Morning, Don landed additional television work as presenter on the BBC Television shows Holiday and Tomorrow's World. Though he had some doubts about being a presenter, he took the jobs as he felt desperate for work. In November 1999, Channel 4 started to air the gardening series Fork to Fork, in which Don and his wife presented segments on growing and cooking organic vegetables. This was followed by three other series hosted by Don between 1999 and 2003: Real Gardens, Lost Gardens, and Don Roaming.

==== Gardeners' World ====
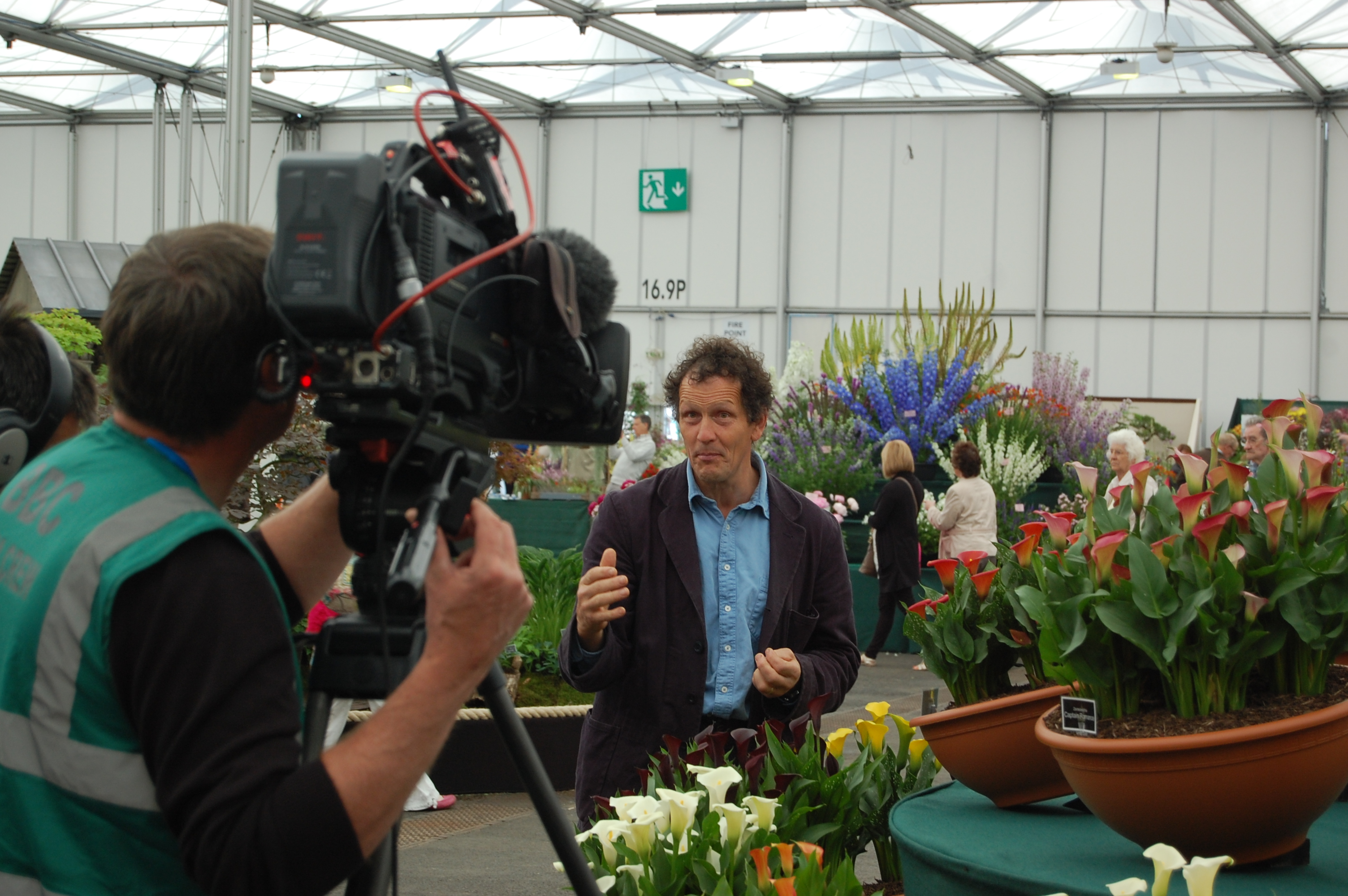
Don presenting at Gardeners' World Live in 2012

In September 2002, the BBC announced Don as the new lead presenter of its long-running series Gardeners' World from 2003, succeeding Alan Titchmarsh. Don is the first self-taught horticulturist presenter in the show's history. Don hosted the show until he put his career on hold to recover from his minor stroke in 2008, and the show continued with Toby Buckland filling in as host. During Don's initial stint, viewing figures fell from 5 million to 2 million, this fall being most frequently blamed on the BBC's decision to change the show's format soon after Don's arrival. After viewing figures fell below two million for the first time in 2009, the BBC announced further changes to the programme to entice viewers back. In December 2010, Don announced his return as host for the 2011 series. Reaction to the announcement was divided on the programme's blog.

Initially, Don filmed episodes of Gardeners' World in Berryfields, a rented garden in Stratford-upon-Avon. When he returned as host in 2011, Don began to present from his own garden, Longmeadow, in Ivington, Herefordshire. He was frequently seen on screen with his Golden Retriever Nigel until the dog died in May 2020, aged 11. In 2016, Don introduced viewers to his new golden retriever, Nell. This was followed by the addition of Patti, a Yorkshire Terrier, in April 2020. Nell died in October 2023 and Patti died in September 2026.

In 2019, Don appeared as himself in an episode of This Time with Alan Partridge, in which Partridge tries to entrap Don in a sting operation by offering him one billion pounds to agree to product placement on his TV show.

In February 2024, Don stated that he had no immediate plans to leave Gardeners' World, saying, "I'm now 68, I was going to stop when I was 65. I'll now go on till I'm 70 and then reconsider. The reason for that is that, apart from anything else, it's not so much wanting my garden back, although there's a strong element of that. .. It's just that, whilst I've still got energy, there are lots of other projects I want to do that mean I can't be here every week."

In May 2026, Don was given an official "reminder" of BBC impartiality guidelines after appearing on Gardeners' World wearing a navy blue Barbour jacket while simultaneously featuring in an advertising campaign for the same brand.

In September 2026, he announced that he would be standing down from presenting Gardener's World. His final episode was broadcast on 6 November.

==== Own series ====
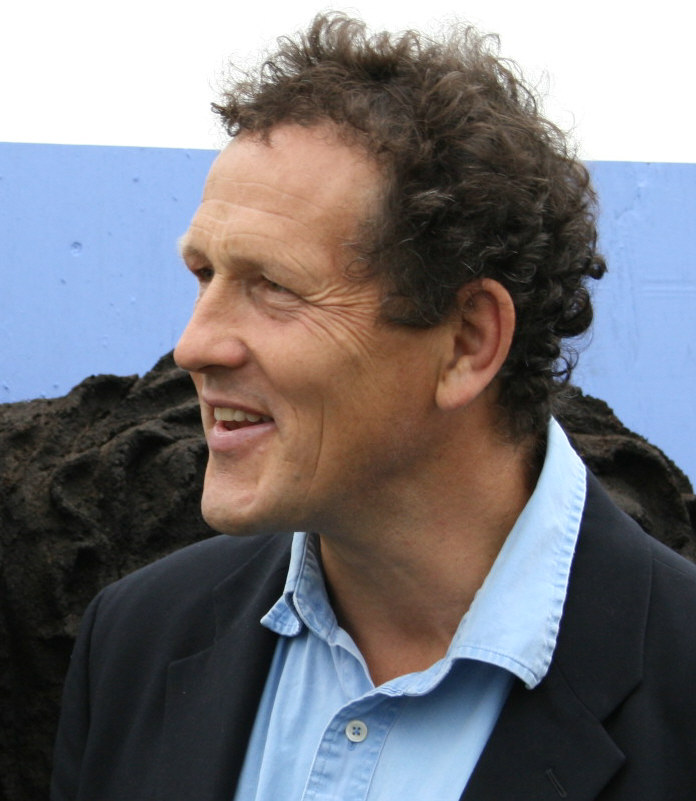
Don in 2007

Don is also known for writing and presenting his own series. In 2005, he set up a 6-acre (2.4 ha) smallholding in Herefordshire so a group of young drug offenders could work the land. The project was documented for the BBC series Growing Out of Trouble, airing in 2006. This was followed by the ambitious BBC series Around the World in 80 Gardens in 2008, where Don visited 80 gardens of a variety of styles worldwide.

In 2010, Don presented My Dream Farm, a Channel 4 series which helped people learn to become successful smallholders, and Mastercrafts, a BBC series which celebrated six traditional British crafts. Monty Don's Italian Gardens aired on the BBC in 2011, which was followed by Monty Don's French Gardens, in 2013. Later that year, Don presented an episode of Great British Garden Revival. In 2014, Don became the lead presenter for the BBC's flagship Chelsea Flower Show coverage, again replacing Titchmarsh. In 2023, he presented alongside Joe Swift and Sophie Raworth.

Since 2014, Don has presented three series of Big Dreams, Small Spaces, where he helps amateur gardeners in creating their own "dream spaces" at home. In 2015, Don presented the four-part BBC series The Secret History of the British Garden, charting the development of British gardens from the 17th to the 20th century. Don's next series was Monty Don's Paradise Gardens in 2018, travelling across the Islamic world and beyond in search of paradise gardens and considering their place in the Quran. This was followed by Monty Don's Japanese Gardens in 2019, Monty Don's American Gardens in 2020, Monty Don's Adriatic Gardens in 2022, Monty Don's Spanish Gardens in 2024. and Monty Don's British Gardens in 2025.

In 2025, while introducing his next series, taking him along the length of the Rhine, Don announced it will be his last. The three-part series Monty Don's Rhineland Gardens premiered January 16 2026.

=== RHS Chelsea ===
In 2025, Don, in collaboration with BBC Radio 2, created his first RHS Chelsea Flower Show garden, designed around the needs of dogs. The garden incorporated dog-friendly features such as a lawn, water for wallowing, and shade-providing trees. Created with horticulturist Jamie Butterworth, the garden would be relocated to Battersea Dogs & Cats Home after the show.

=== Writer ===
Don has described himself primarily as a writer, "who happens to have lots of television work." By the early 1990s, Don had written two unpublished novels, The Clematis Affair and An Afternoon in Padua. He later described them as "excruciatingly bad". In January 1994, Allan Jenkins, then editor of The Observer, invited Don to write a weekly gardening column for the newspaper. The column began in February of that year and lasted until May 2006; Jenkins was his editor for seven years. In a piece from 2004 to commemorate the tenth year of the column, Don wrote: "It has been more life-changing than any other work I have done in my adult life." Don has written articles for the Daily Mail and Mail Online since 2004.

In 2005, Routledge published The Jewel Garden: A Story of Despair and Redemption, a joint autobiography and the story of Don and his wife Sarah's home and gardens at Longmeadow. In 2016, Hodder Books published an audiobook of Don's Nigel: My Family and Other Dogs, read by the author.

== Reception and style ==
=== Reception ===
Between 2008 and 2016, Don was President of the Soil Association. He is currently a patron of Bees for Development Trust and the Pope's Grotto Preservation Trust.

Don had never received formal training as a gardener. In 2006, he commented, "I was – am – an amateur gardener and a professional writer. My only authority came from a lifetime of gardening and a passion amounting to an obsession for my own garden."

Don is a keen proponent of organic gardening, becoming "officially" organic in his own garden in 1997. The practice of organic techniques often features in his published and broadcast work. The organic approach is most prominent in his 2003 book The Complete Gardener. This has led him into some controversy with those advocating non-organic techniques, with some criticising his position of influence presenting Gardeners' World and exclusion of non-organic solutions to pests and diseases in the garden.

In June 2020, Prospect magazine declared Don "the nation's gardener". Comedian Joe Lycett has described Monty Don as a "gay icon".

=== Style ===
Don's sartorial style in the garden has been the subject of some critical attention, with Richard D. North commenting, in 2013:

At home and abroad, Monty Don is the paysan manqué. Where an arts presenter might eschew the little black Armani suit and the dazzling white shirt for the crumpled linen, Don's gear retreats into the manly rumpledon of a workman's cotton drill. He is not quite the Mr McGregor of the Potter books: real-life ancient gardeners wore mighty cords and moleskins, tweeds and flannels – and sacks if the weather was bad enough. The Don affectation is one tad more painterly than that. ... I guess that this is where we come up against the row within Monty Don, between the lightly earthy garden enthusiast and the grimmer unworldly hippy moralist. Well, we all have an inner cheerfully accepting Cavalier, and it does battle with our gloomier Roundhead.

In 2005, Don himself dedicated a whole column to this subject, commenting:

I get lots of emails, lots of letters. A few are crazed, quite a few astonishingly demanding... quite a surprisingly large chunk of letters and emails are about one specific topic that is at first appearance only tangentially about gardening. These are the ones asking me about the clothes that I garden in.

In 2026, he featured in Barbour's "Way Of Life" campaign, in which he discussed his relationship with nature.

== Personal life ==
=== Family ===
Don married Sarah Erskine in 1983. They have two sons and a daughter. The couple lived in Islington, north London, while Don pursued postgraduate study at the London School of Economics and worked as a waiter at Joe Allen restaurant in Covent Garden and later as a binman. The couple then moved to the De Beauvoir Town area of Hackney where they made their first garden.

In 1989, they relocated to The Hanburies, a country house in Herefordshire. The making of the garden there, and the subsequent loss of the house in the aftermath of the crash of their jewellery business, was the subject of Don's first book, The Prickotty Bush. In 1991, the Dons bought a home in Ivington, Herefordshire where they started to create a new garden named Longmeadow. The home was unfit to live in at the time of purchase, so while they refurbished it they rented a home in Leominster that was infested with rats and had no heating. They moved into their Ivington home at the end of 1992.

=== Nigel and other pets ===
Nigel in 2019

Don has owned many dogs throughout his adult life. From 2022, he owned Ned, a Golden Retriever and Patti, a Yorkshire Terrier, both of which have been featured on camera with Don on Gardeners' World. He also owns other dogs that are not seen on the show. Nellie, another Golden Retriever, died in October 2023. The coppice at Longmeadow holds the graves of Don's many pets, including dogs Nigel, Nellie, Beaufort, Red, Poppy and Barry, and cats Stimpy and Blue. Don also has a sheep farm, on which he keeps 500 ewes.

Nigel was a male Golden Retriever dog owned by Don. Nigel made many appearances on Gardeners' World, sometimes with Nellie. The dog was chosen as a seven-week-old puppy from a litter in the Forest of Dean on 1 July 2008, and was popular with viewers who were concerned when he disappeared from the programme in September 2012. He had injured himself after twisting sideways when jumping to catch a tennis ball and had ruptured an intervertebral disc in his spine. Nigel recovered and resumed his television appearances.

Don said that he had chosen Nigel because the domestic dog signifies the good and bad in human relationships with nature; humans can prioritise fluffy animals over others. In September 2016, an autobiography entitled Nigel: My Family and Other Dogs was published, telling the story of Nigel and the other dogs in Don's life, including the female Golden Retriever, Nellie. In May 2020, Don announced, through his Twitter and Instagram pages, that Nigel had died, aged 11. Don told the BBC Radio 4 Today programme that Nigel had been more than a companion and had helped him with his struggles with depression. He said, "He was a bear of slightly limited brain, what he had was this absolute sense of purity. He exuded a kind of unsullied innocence and we all love our dogs; everybody thinks their dog is special. I've had lots of dogs and there was something special about Nigel." As with Don's other dogs, Nigel and Nellie are buried in the garden at Longmeadow.

=== Health ===
Don has suffered with depression since his mid-twenties. He first wrote about his experiences with it, and its effect on his personal life, in a piece for The Observer in 2000. His editor recalled that it "changed the way that people saw him" and Don himself said the article generated "a very immediate response" from readers. Don recalled "great spans of muddy time" in his life and realised that gardening "heals me better than any medicine". This quote served as the inspiration for William Doyle's 2021 album Great Spans of Muddy Time.

At one point, Don's wife threatened to leave with their children if he did not seek help. After receiving cognitive behavioural therapy and taking Prozac for a short time, Don quit both when he realised his depression was mostly seasonal, which he attributed to seasonal affective disorder, and found relief with a light box.

In August 2007, Don suffered from a bout of peritonitis, an abdominal infection. His wife had found him unconscious on the floor and he was rushed to hospital for emergency surgery.

In February 2008, Don suffered a minor stroke at home. He had been feeling unwell since the previous Christmas, owing mostly to exhaustion from travelling to film Around the World in 80 Gardens. When his symptoms did not improve, a brain scan weeks later revealed a temporary blockage in one of the arteries to his brain. In May 2008, he put his career on hold to recover.

In 2015, Don said that years of gardening had left him with sore knees, one of which caused constant pain and needed replacing.

In May 2022, it was reported that Don had COVID-19 and had been bedridden for four days. He contracted COVID-19 again in May 2023.

=== Other ===
In July 2006, he appeared on BBC Radio 4's Desert Island Discs, choosing an eclectic mix of pop and classical records; the Beatles' "A Hard Day's Night" was his favourite disc, his book choice was Collected Poems by Henry Vaughan and his luxury item the painting Hendrikje Bathing by Rembrandt.

In 2006, Don had launched the Monty Don Project, an effort to assist drug users by involving them in agriculture and gardening. The project was the focus of both a book and a TV series, Growing Out Of Trouble.

== Honours ==
Don was made an Officer of the Order of the British Empire (OBE) in the 2018 Birthday Honours for services to horticulture, to broadcasting and to charity.

In May 2022, he was awarded the Victoria Medal of Honour by the council of the Royal Horticultural Society.

Don was appointed as a deputy lieutenant of Herefordshire on 14 October 2024.

== Publications ==
=== Books ===
- The Prickotty Bush (1990)
- The Weekend Gardener (1995)
- The Sensuous Garden (1997)
- Gardening Mad (1998; with Fleur Olby)
- Urban Jungle: The Simple Way to Tame Your Town Garden (1998)
- Fork to Fork (1999; released as From the Garden to the Table: Growing, Cooking, and Eating Your Own Food in 2003)
- Threads of Hope: Learning to Live with Depression (2003), ed. Flora McDonnell, with contributions by Montagu Don, Margaret Drabble, Wendy Cope, and others
- The Complete Gardener (2003; 2nd edn. 2021)
- The Jewel Garden (2004; with Sarah Don)
- Gardeners' World: Gardening from Berryfields (2005)
- The Organic Gardener (2005)
- Growing Out of Trouble (2006)
- My Roots: A Decade in the Garden (2006)
- Around the World in 80 Gardens (2008)
- The Ivington Diaries (2009)
- My Dream Farm (2010)
- The Home Cookbook (2010; with Sarah Don)
- Extraordinary Gardens of the World (2010)
- The Great Gardens of Italy (2011; with Derry Moore)
- Gardening at Longmeadow (2012)
- The Road to Le Tholonet: A French Garden Journey (2013)
- Nigel: My Family and Other Dogs (2016)
- Down to Earth: Gardening Wisdom (2017)
- Paradise Gardens: The World's Most Beautiful Islamic Gardens (2018; with Derry Moore)
- Japanese Gardens: A Journey (2019; with Derry Moore)
- My Garden World: The Natural Year (2020)
- American Gardens (2020; with Derry Moore)
- Venetian Gardens (2022; with Derry Moore)
- The Gardening Book (2023)
- British Gardens (2026; with Derry Moore)

=== DVDs ===
- Around the World in 80 Gardens (2008)
- Monty Don's Italian Gardens (2011)
- Monty Don's French Gardens (2013)
- Monty Don's Real Craft (2014)
- The Secret History of the British Garden (2015)
- Monty Don's Paradise Gardens (2018)
- Monty Don's Japanese Gardens (2019)
- Monty Don's American Gardens (2020)
- Monty Don's Adriatic Gardens (2022)
