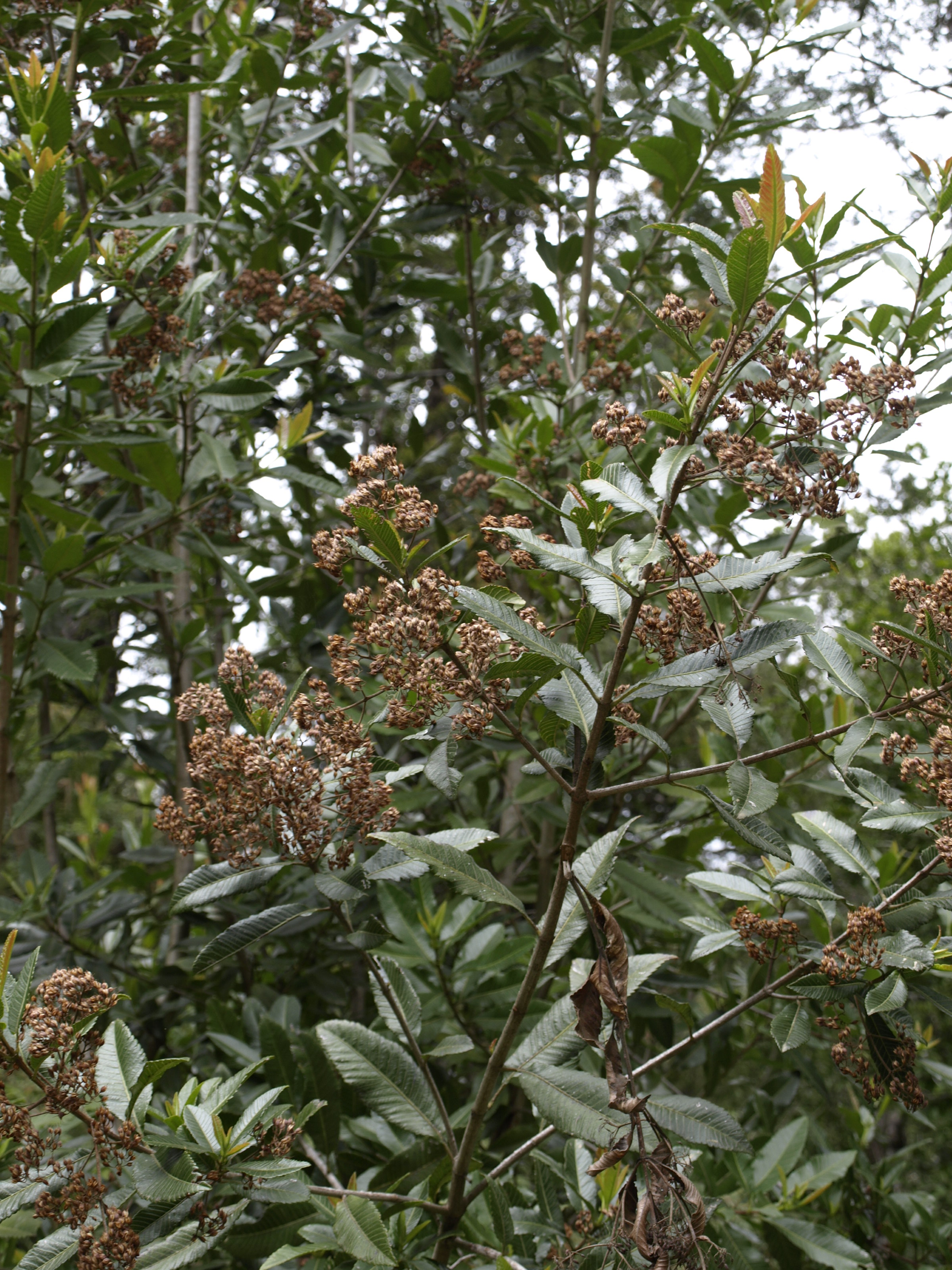

Conservation status
- Least Concern (IUCN 3.1)

Scientific classification
- Kingdom: Plantae
- Clade: Tracheophytes
- Clade: Angiosperms
- Clade: Eudicots
- Clade: Rosids
- Order: Oxalidales
- Family: Cunoniaceae
- Genus: Caldcluvia; D.Don
- Species: C. paniculata

Binomial name
- Caldcluvia paniculata (Cav.) D.Don

Synonyms
- Dieterica Ser.; Caldcluvia paniculata var. machaena G.Kunkel; Dieterica paniculata Ser.; Weinmannia chilensis DC.; Weinmannia corymbosa Ruiz & Pav.; Weinmannia paniculata Cav.

= Caldcluvia =

Tiaca

Species of tree

Caldcluvia is a monotypic genus of flowering plants in the family Cunoniaceae. The only species in the genus is Caldcluvia paniculata, known as tiaca, an evergreen tree native to southern and central Chile and southern Argentina. It is found from Ñuble to Aisén (36 to 45°S). Most species that were previously placed in the genus are now placed in Ackama, Opocunonia and Spiraeopsis.

== Description ==
Caldcluvia paniculata can grow up to 20 m (65 ft) in height and up to 60 cm (24 in) in diameter. The bark is grayish brown. The leaves are oppositely arranged, have toothed edges, and are oblong and lanceolate shaped. Leaf size is 7-15 cm long, 2–4 cm wide, with the apex and base acute. Leaf color is glossy green above and whitish and somewhat hairy below. The petioles are fluted and hairy about 0-7-1 cm long. The white flowers clustered in axillary peduncles are hermaphrodite, peduncles and pedicels are hairy, 4-5 hairy sepals and more or less imbricate, 4 –5 petals alternate to the sepals. 8-10 stamens, 2 styles. The fruit is an acuminate capsule, hairy and crowned by persistent styles, inside of which there are dark brown seeds about 1 mm long.

The tree requires wet climate, tolerates up to 40% shade, and may need partial shade in some locations. It is classified in USDA Hardiness Zone 9. Germination from seeds has a success rate of less than 30%.

== Taxonomy ==
Caldcluvia was named after Scottish botanist Alexander Caldcleugh, who travelled to South America between 1819–1825; he collected plants for Royal Botanic Gardens, Kew in England. As of April 2021, Plants of the World Online accepted only one species, Caldcluvia paniculata. The epithet paniculata, or panicled, means "with panicles".

== Cultivation and uses ==
The leaves are used as herbal tea for the treatment of colds and stomach disorders. It has been planted in Northern Ireland.
