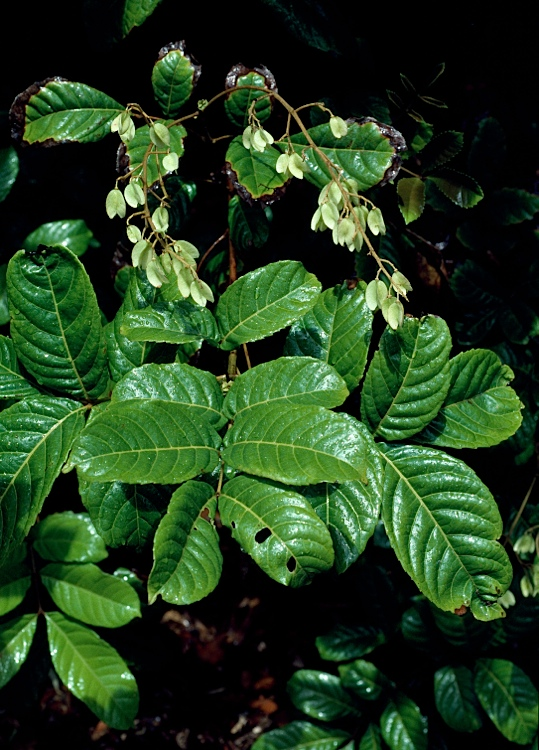
- Foliage and fruit. Mount Coot-tha; Botanic Gardens, Brisbane

Conservation status
- Least Concern (IUCN 3.1)
- Least Concern (NCA)

Scientific classification
- Kingdom: Plantae
- Clade: Tracheophytes
- Clade: Angiosperms
- Clade: Eudicots
- Clade: Rosids
- Order: Oxalidales
- Family: Cunoniaceae
- Genus: Gillbeea
- Species: G. adenopetala

Binomial name
- Gillbeea adenopetala F.Muell.

= Gillbeea adenopetala =

Pink alder

Species of flowering plant

Gillbeea adenopetala, commonly known as Pink alder, is an evergreen tree in the largely southern hemisphere family Cunoniaceae. It was first described in 1865 and is endemic to a small part of Queensland, Australia.

== Description ==
Gillbeea adenopetala is a tree growing up to 35 m (115 ft) tall with buttress roots. The leaves are arranged in opposite pairs on the twigs and are compound, having between 3 and 9 leaflets and an overall length of 30 cm (12 in). The stipules are about 10 mm (0.39 in) long by 4 mm (0.16 in) wide with finely serrate margins. The leaflets generally reach up to 15 cm (5.9 in) long by 5 cm (2.0 in) wide, and are glabrous or hairy above, and hairy to sparsely hairy on the underside.

The inflorescence is a panicle produced at the apex of the branches. Flowers are small, about 8 mm (0.31 in) diameter with 4 or 5 pink fleshy petals. At the tips of the petals there are usually 2 small glands.

The fruit is a 3-, or rarely 4-, winged samara that may be green, cream or brown and measures about 20 mm (0.79 in) long by 15 mm (0.59 in) wide.

=== Phenology ===
Flowering occurs from July to December, and the fruits appear from July to March.

== Taxonomy ==
This species was first described in 1865 by the Victorian colonial botanist Ferdinand von Mueller, based on material collected by John Dallachy in Rockingham Bay. Mueller published his description in his massive work Fragmenta phytographiæ Australiæ.

=== Etymology ===
The genus name Gillbeea was chosen by Mueller in Honour of the English-Australian doctor William Gillbee. The species epithet adenopetala is created from the Ancient Greek words adḗn meaning "gland", and pétalon meaning "petal". It refers to the two glands that occur on the tips of the petals of this species.

== Distribution and habitat ==
The pink alder is common in well developed rainforest throughout much of the Wet Tropics area, from the Mount Windsor and Mount Lewis National Parks west and southwest of the Daintree River respectively, to Abergowrie a little north of Cardwell, and including the Atherton Tableland. It can be found on various soil types at elevations from sea level to about 1,200 m (3,900 ft), often along watercourses.

== Ecology ==
The fruit are eaten by king parrots (Alisterus scapularis) and crimson rosellas (Platycercus elegans).

== Conservation ==
This species is listed by the Queensland Department of Environment and Science as least concern. As of 25 March 2023, it has not been assessed by the International Union for Conservation of Nature (IUCN).

== Uses ==
Although this is a relatively large tree, it was generally not used for timber due to the presence of lenses of included bark.

== Gallery ==
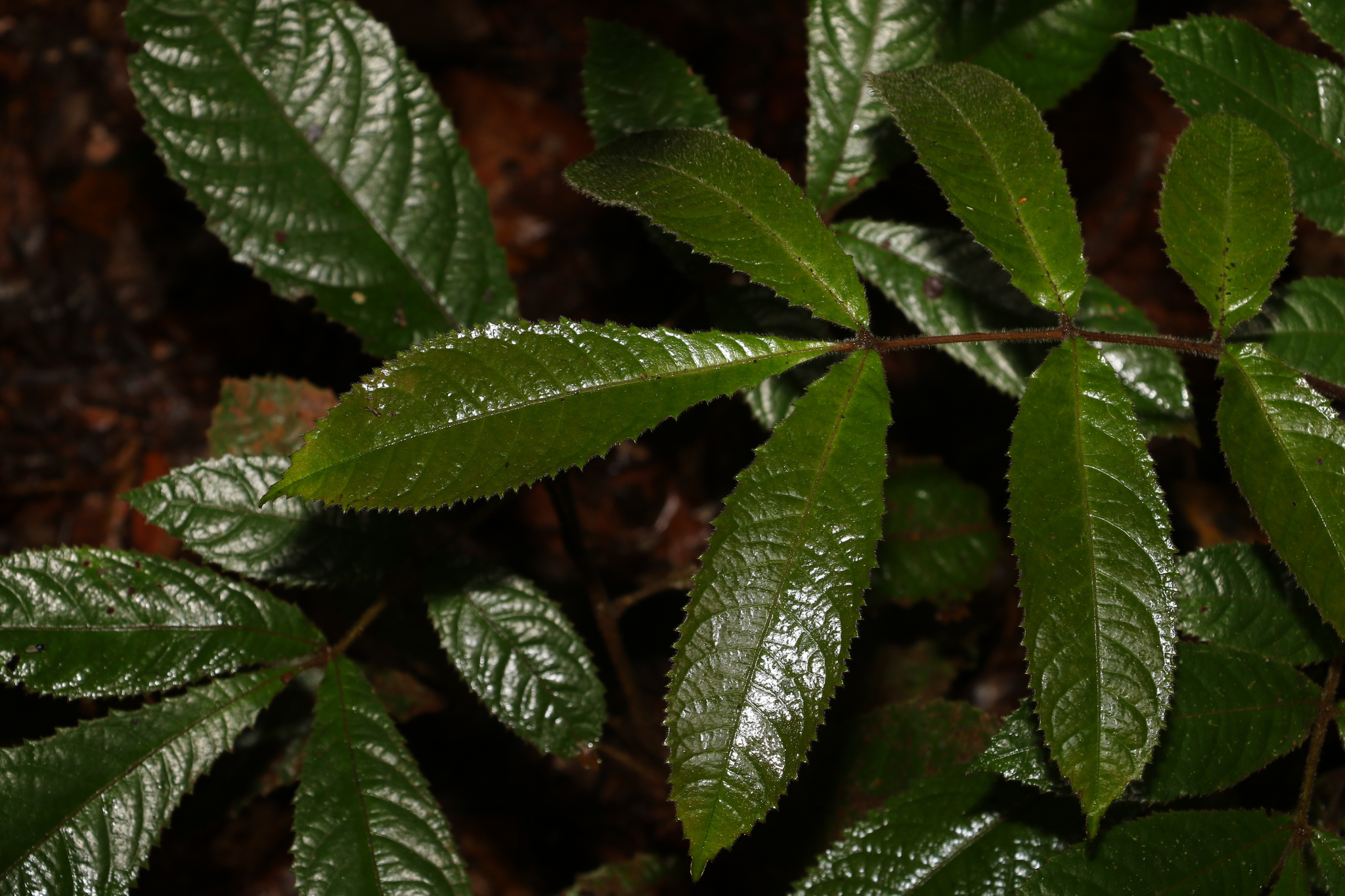
Foliage

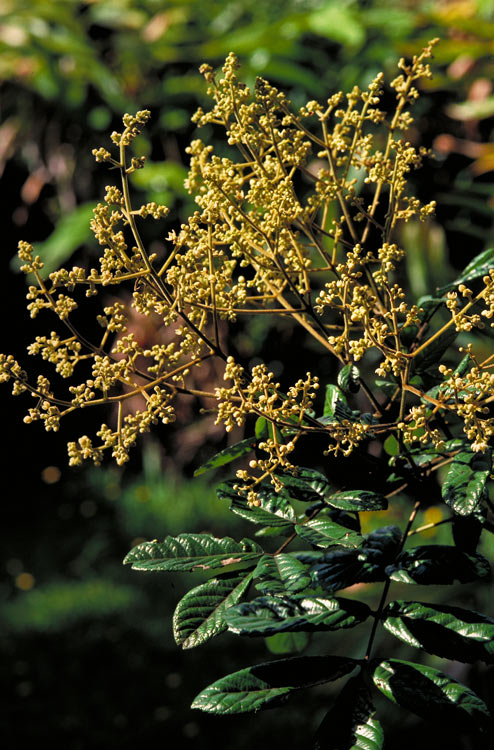
Inflorescence

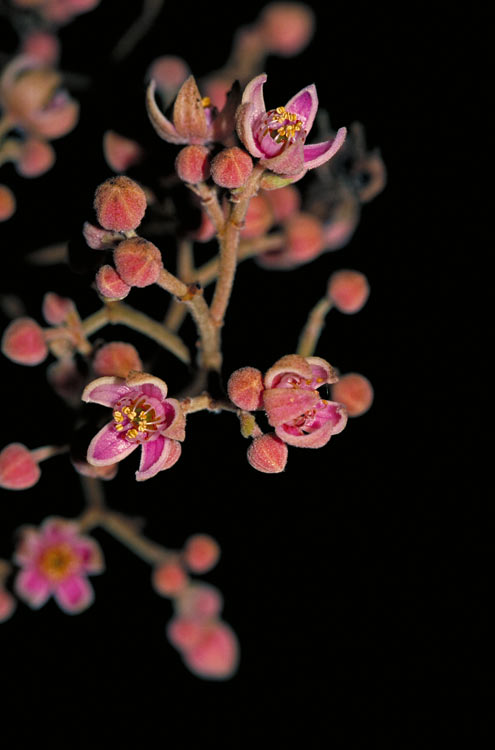
Flowers

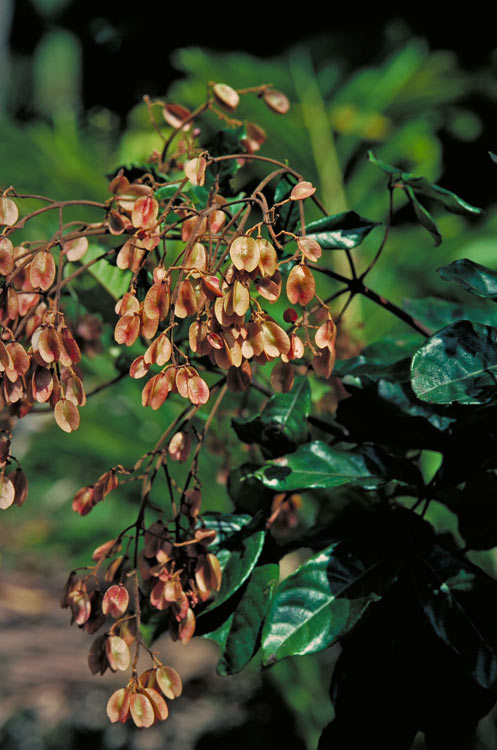
Fruit

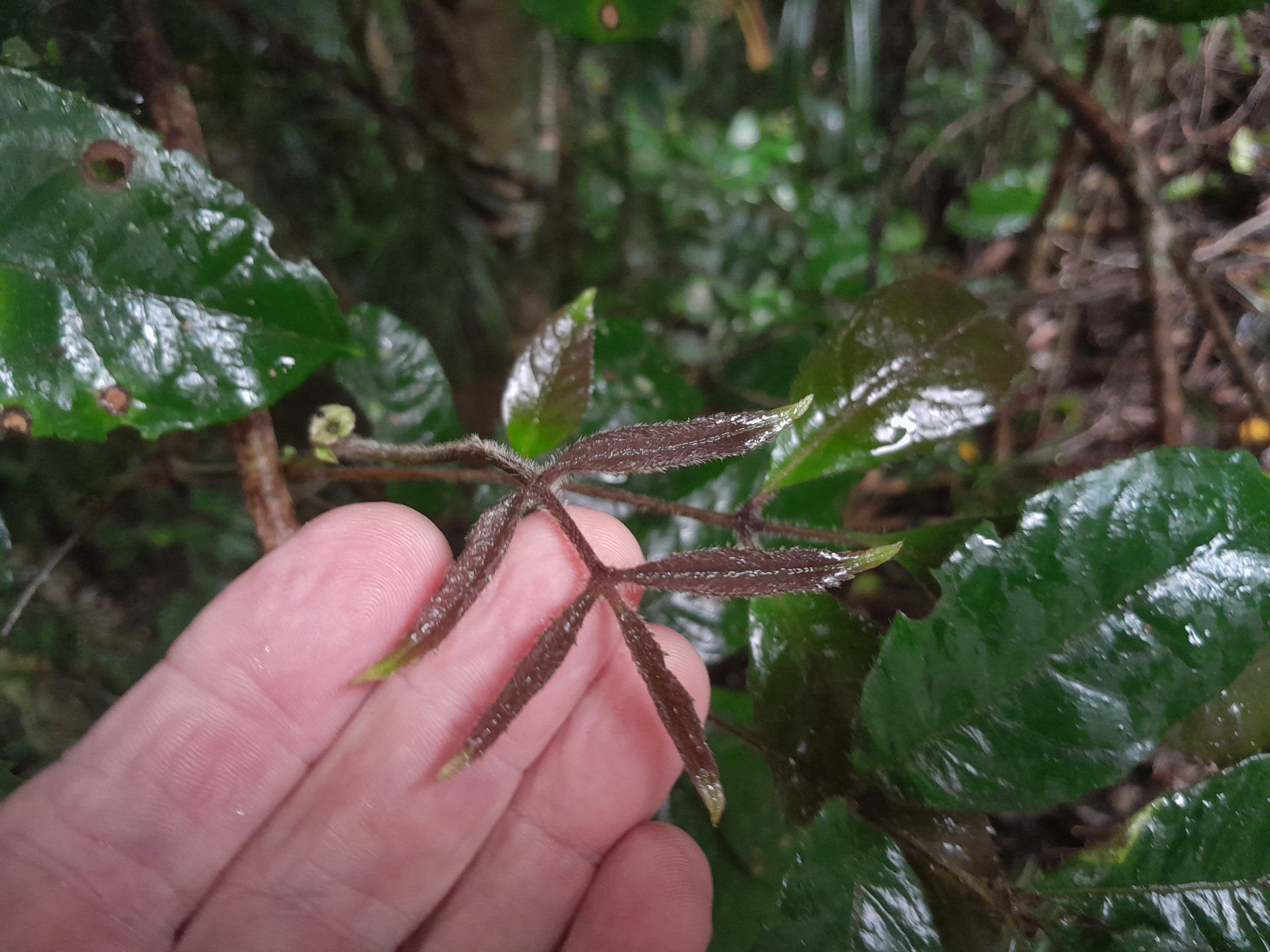
New growth

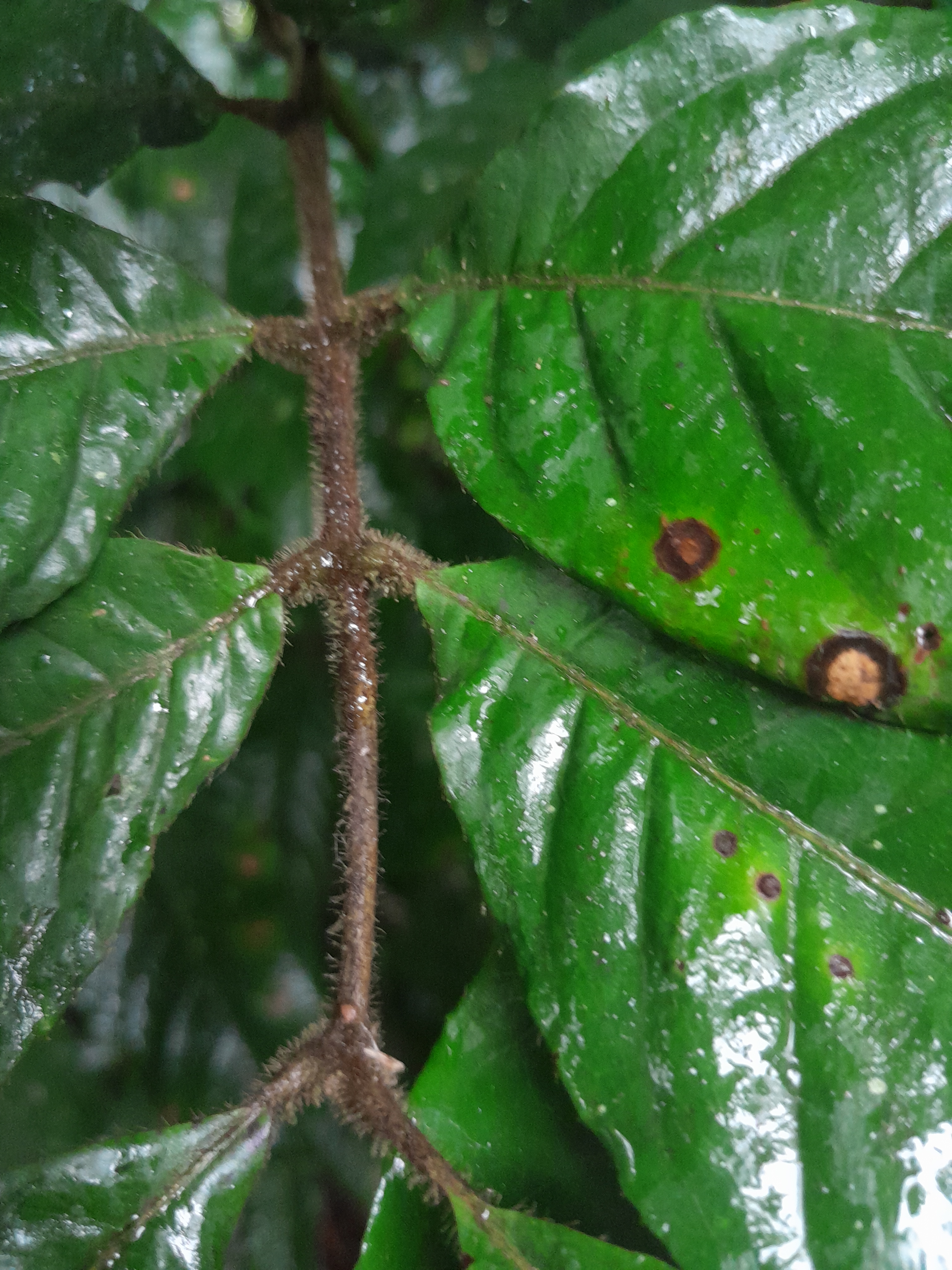
Densely hairy stems
