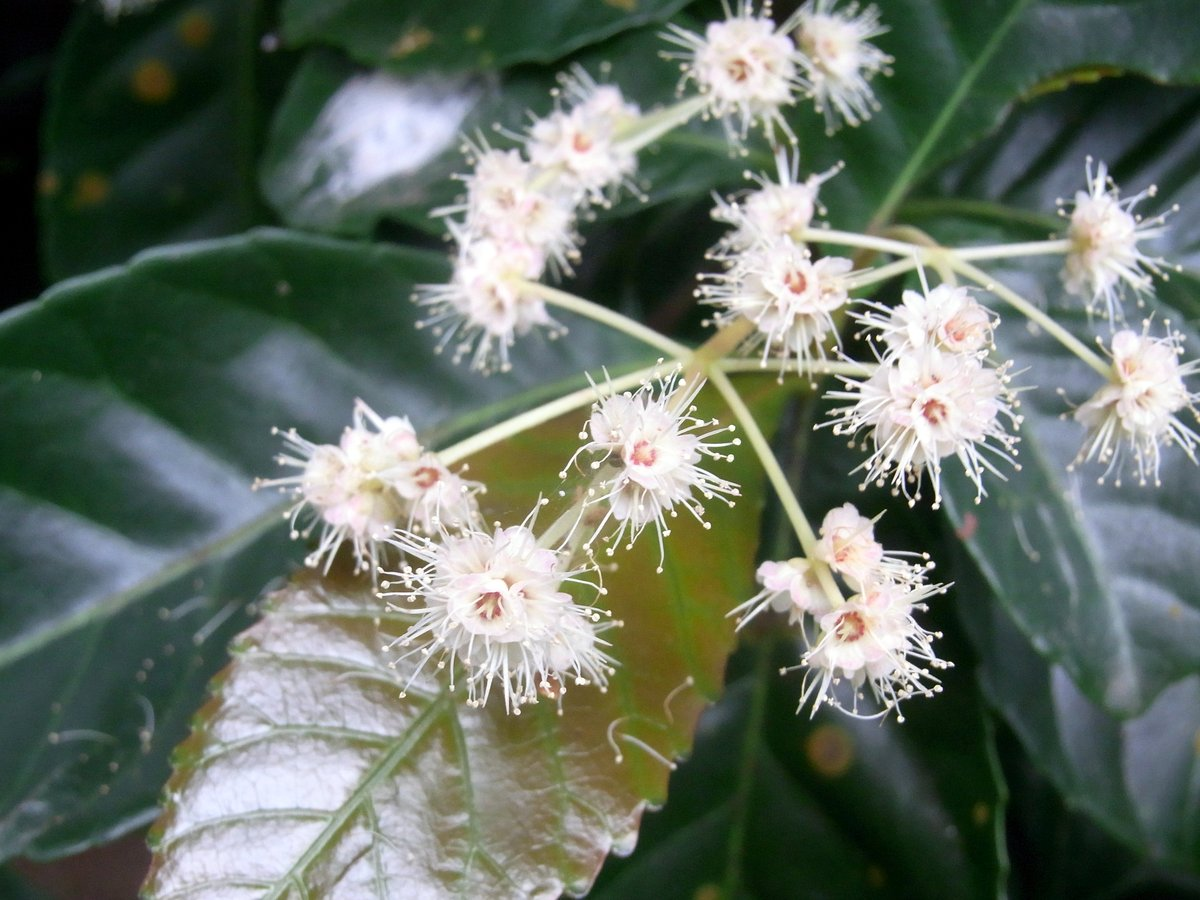
- Royal Botanic Gardens, Sydney, Australia

Conservation status
- Least Concern (IUCN 3.1)

Scientific classification
- Kingdom: Plantae
- Clade: Tracheophytes
- Clade: Angiosperms
- Clade: Eudicots
- Clade: Rosids
- Order: Oxalidales
- Family: Cunoniaceae
- Genus: Pullea
- Species: P. stutzeri

Binomial name
- Pullea stutzeri (F.Muell.) Gibbs

Synonyms
- Callicoma stutzeri F.Muell.; Callicoma stutzeri f. subpubescens Domin; Callicoma stutzeri var. subpubescens Domin; Callicoma stutzeri var. glabrifolia Domin; Callicoma stutzeri f. glabrifolia Domin; Stutzeria callicomoides F.Muell.

= Pullea stutzeri =

Hard alder

Species of tree

Pullea stutzeri, the Hard Alder, is a species of rainforest plant in the ancient family Cunoniaceae. It is endemic to the wet tropics rainforests of northeastern Queensland, Australia.
