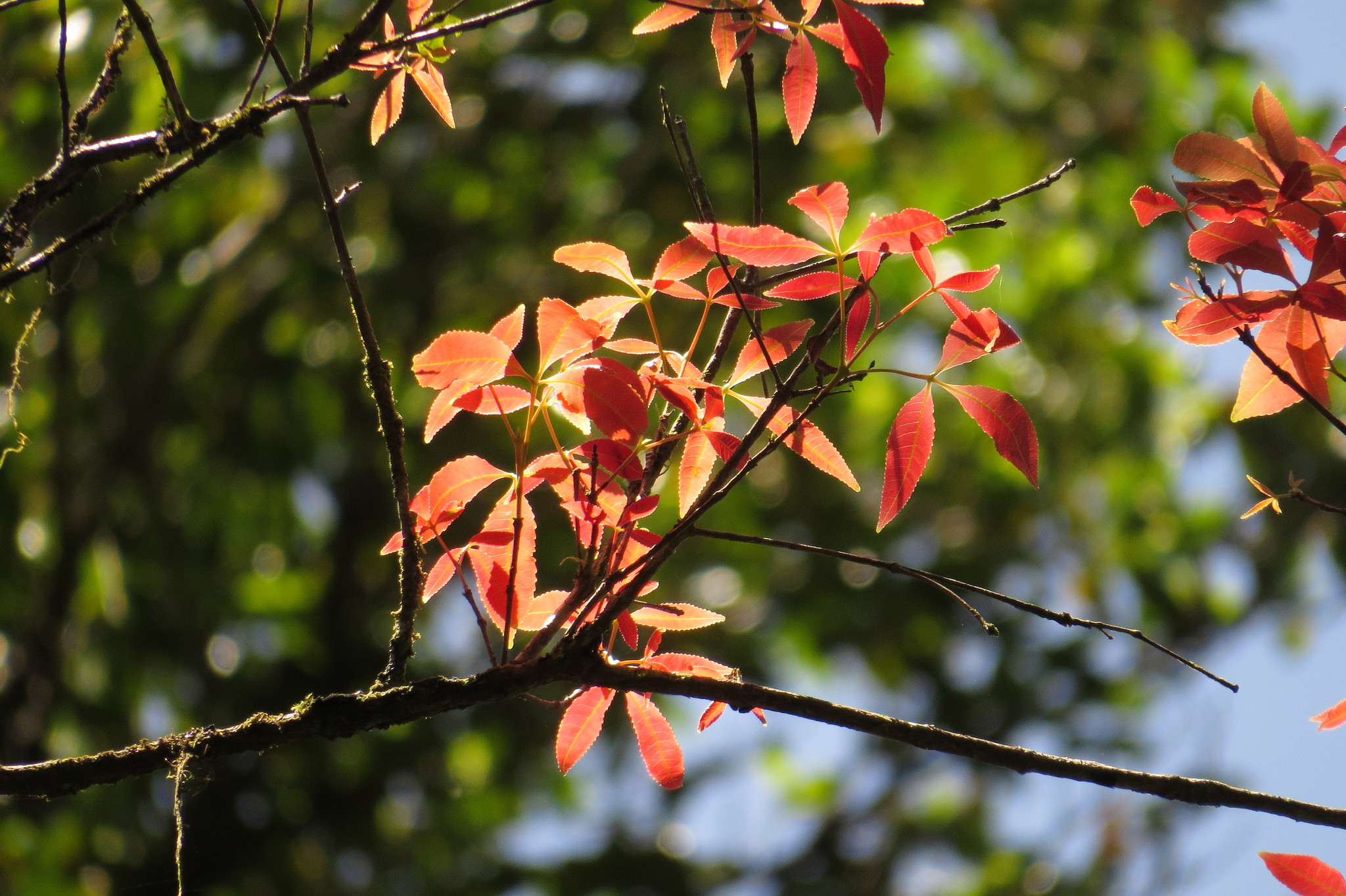
- New leaf flush

Conservation status
- Least Concern (NCA)
- Least Concern (IUCN 3.1)

Scientific classification
- Kingdom: Plantae
- Clade: Tracheophytes
- Clade: Angiosperms
- Clade: Eudicots
- Clade: Rosids
- Order: Oxalidales
- Family: Cunoniaceae
- Genus: Pseudoweinmannia
- Species: P. apetala

Binomial name
- Pseudoweinmannia apetala (F.M.Bailey) Engl.

Synonyms
- Weinmannia apetalata F.M.Bailey

= Pseudoweinmannia apetala =

Species of flowering plant

Pseudoweinmannia apetala, commonly known as red carabeen, is a species of flowering plant in the family Cunoniaceae. It is a buttressed tree endemic to the Wet Tropics bioregion of Queensland, Australia, and was first described in 1893 (as Weinmannia apetalata) by Frederick Manson Bailey. It was later moved to the genus Pseudoweinmannia by Adolf Engler. It grows in rainforest as well as drier forests, and has been given the conservation status of least concern.
