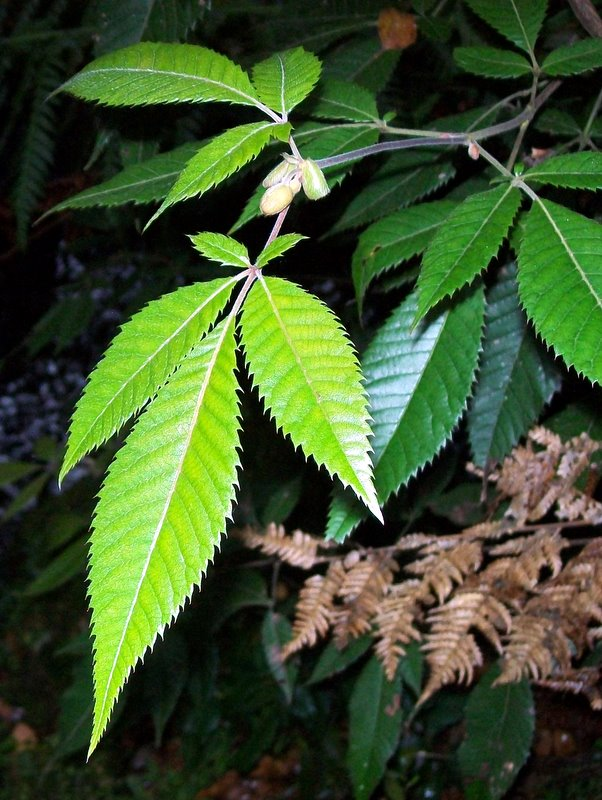
- Vesselowskya venusta at Gloucester Tops, Australia

Conservation status
- Least Concern (IUCN 3.1)

Scientific classification
- Kingdom: Plantae
- Clade: Tracheophytes
- Clade: Angiosperms
- Clade: Eudicots
- Clade: Rosids
- Order: Oxalidales
- Family: Cunoniaceae
- Genus: Vesselowskya
- Species: V. venusta

Binomial name
- Vesselowskya venusta A.C. Rozefelds, R.W. Barnes & Pellow

= Vesselowskya venusta =

Barrington Tops marara

Species of tree

Vesselowskya venusta is a rainforest plant of restricted distribution from eastern New South Wales, Australia. The common name is Barrington Tops marara. The species name venusta is from the Latin, meaning "charming". Referring to the beauty of the long flower stems. The genus is named after the Russian botanist E. Vesselowsky.

== Habitat ==
Growing over creeks in cool rainforest areas. Often associated with the Antarctic beech. From Barrington Tops in the south to Werrikimbe National Park further to the north.

== Description ==
The Barrington Tops marara is a bush or small tree to 8 metres (25 ft) tall, and 25 cm (10 in) in diameter. Often seen with a multi stemmed and cylindrical shaped trunk. The bark is fairly smooth, fawn or brown in colour. With raised bumps in vertical lines.

=== Leaves, flowers and fruit ===
The leaves are arranged oppositely on the stem, in groups of threes or fives. 8 to 17 cm long and 3 to 6 cm wide. The leaflets at the base are smaller than those at the top of the leaf formation. The leaflets are serrated and have a pronounced tip. There are no oil glands present at the base of the leaf stipules.

Flowers form from October to November on racemes. The top of the anther is rounded. Sepals have a row of hairs on the outside surface.

Fruit matures from March to June, being a pale brown hairy capsule. As the seeds are small, they require a light covering, and seeds should not be buried too deeply in the seed raising mixture.
