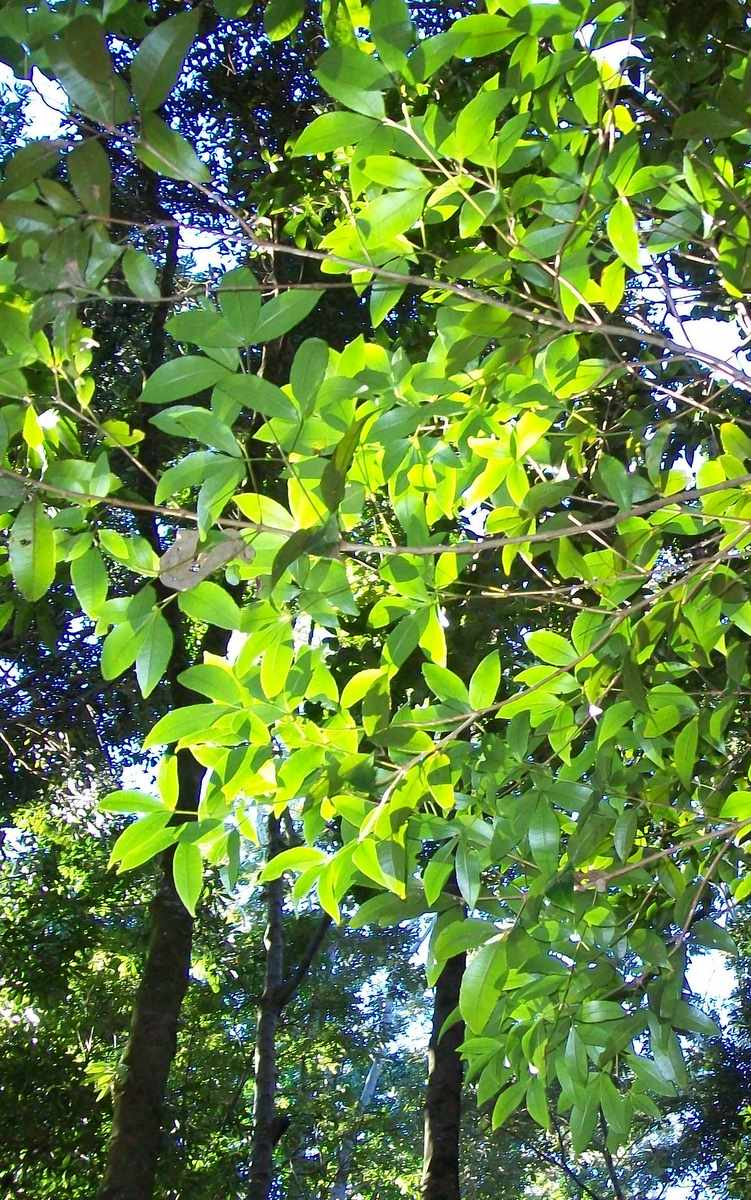

Conservation status
- Least Concern (IUCN 3.1)

Scientific classification
- Kingdom: Plantae
- Clade: Tracheophytes
- Clade: Angiosperms
- Clade: Eudicots
- Clade: Rosids
- Order: Oxalidales
- Family: Cunoniaceae
- Genus: Pseudoweinmannia
- Species: P. lachnocarpa

Binomial name
- Pseudoweinmannia lachnocarpa (F.Muell.) Engl.

Synonyms
- Geissois lachnocarpa (F.Muell.) Maiden; Weinmannia lachnocarpa F.Muell.; Weinmannia lachnocarpa var. parvifolia F.M.Bailey; Windmannia lachnocarpa (F.Muell.) Kuntze

= Pseudoweinmannia lachnocarpa =

Rose marara

Species of tree

Pseudoweinmannia lachnocarpa is a rainforest tree of eastern Australia. Common names include rose marara, mararie, scrub rosewood and red carabeen. The species name lachnocarpa is from Greek, referring to the "woolly fruit". The genus name refers to the similarity of another genus, Weinmannia, after the German eighteenth century pharmacist J.W. Weinmann.

== Taxonomy ==
Originally described by Ferdinand von Mueller as Weinmannia lachnocarpa in 1874, it was given its current name in 1930 by Adolf Engler. It is a member of the family Cunoniaceae.

== Habitat ==
This tree is found in prime rainforest situations, on the better alluvial and volcanic soils with high rainfall. In riverine, littoral, tropical and sub tropical rainforest from the Richmond River, New South Wales to Cooktown in tropical Queensland.

== Description ==
A small to large tree, up to 40 metres tall, and a very wide butt of 2.5 metres. The base of the tree is often significantly and widely buttressed. The thin bark is grey or fawn. Rough to touch with small pustules and scales. Small branches smooth, greyish white or brown. With green at the tips and white oval shaped lenticels.

Leaves are in threes, opposite on the stem. Leaflets 3 to 15 cm long, 1 to 5 cm wide. Elliptic in shape, toothed, glossy green and almost without leaf stalks. Leaf veins raised and noticeable on both surfaces.

=== Flowers and fruit ===
White flowers form in August on racemes, about 5 cm long. As with the related coachwood, the flowers have no petals. Fruit matures from February to April, being an ovate capsule, 6 to 9 mm in diameter, covered in golden hairs. Seeds are egg shaped, 1 mm in diameter. Germination from fresh seed is unreliable.
