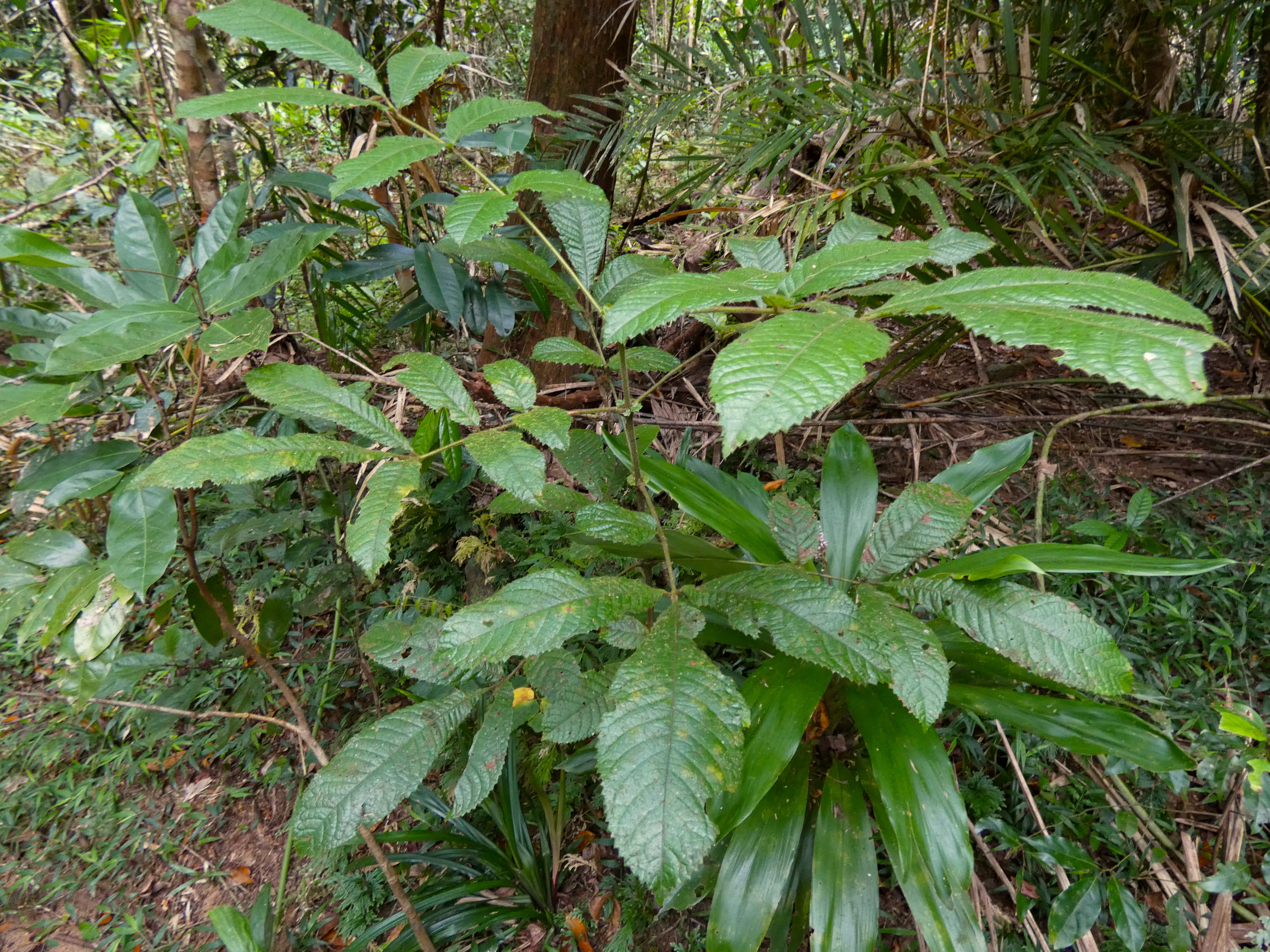
- Near Cape Tribulation

Conservation status
- Least Concern (IUCN 3.1)

Scientific classification
- Kingdom: Plantae
- Clade: Tracheophytes
- Clade: Angiosperms
- Clade: Eudicots
- Clade: Rosids
- Order: Oxalidales
- Family: Cunoniaceae
- Genus: Gillbeea
- Species: G. whypallana

Binomial name
- Gillbeea whypallana Rozefelds & Pellow

= Gillbeea whypallana =

Species of flowering plant

Gillbeea whypallana, commonly known as pink alder, is a species of plant in the family Cunoniaceae. It is a rainforest tree native to a small part of the Wet Tropics bioregion of Queensland, Australia, first described in 2000. It has a conservation status of least concern.

== Description ==
Gillbeea whypallana is a tree growing to about 20 m (66 ft) in height and up to 50 cm (20 in) diameter. It has a straight trunk and nondescript bark. Stipules are quite large, about 10 mm (0.39 in) wide and long, with toothed margins. The leaves are compound with up to seven leaflets, including a terminal leaflet. Most parts of the plant are densely hairy.

The inflorescences are panicles appearing at the ends of the branches, and may be 30 cm (12 in) long. Flowers have four or five petals and sepals and are about 6 to 8 mm (0.24 to 0.31 in) diameter. They have ten stamens in two whorls, the outer ones about 2 mm (0.08 in) long, inner whorl about 1.2 mm (0.05 in) long. The ovary usually has three carpels, sometimes four, and the disc is orange. The fruit is a three- or four-winged samara.

== Distribution and habitat ==
It occurs in rainforest areas of northeast Queensland, from Mount Lewis National Park north to the area around Rossville, at altitudes from sea level up to about 1,100 m (3,600 ft). It grows in soils of various types, but favours wetter areas such as gullies and beside watercourses.

== Conservation ==
As of October 2025, this species has been assessed to be of least concern by the International Union for Conservation of Nature (IUCN) and by the Queensland Government under its Nature Conservation Act. The IUCN supports its assessment citing a large population and the lack of any identified current or future threats. The Queensland Government does not publish any justification for its conservation assessments.

== Ecology ==
The fruits of this plant are eaten by Australian king parrots and crimson rosellas.

== Gallery ==
Herbarium sheet with fruit

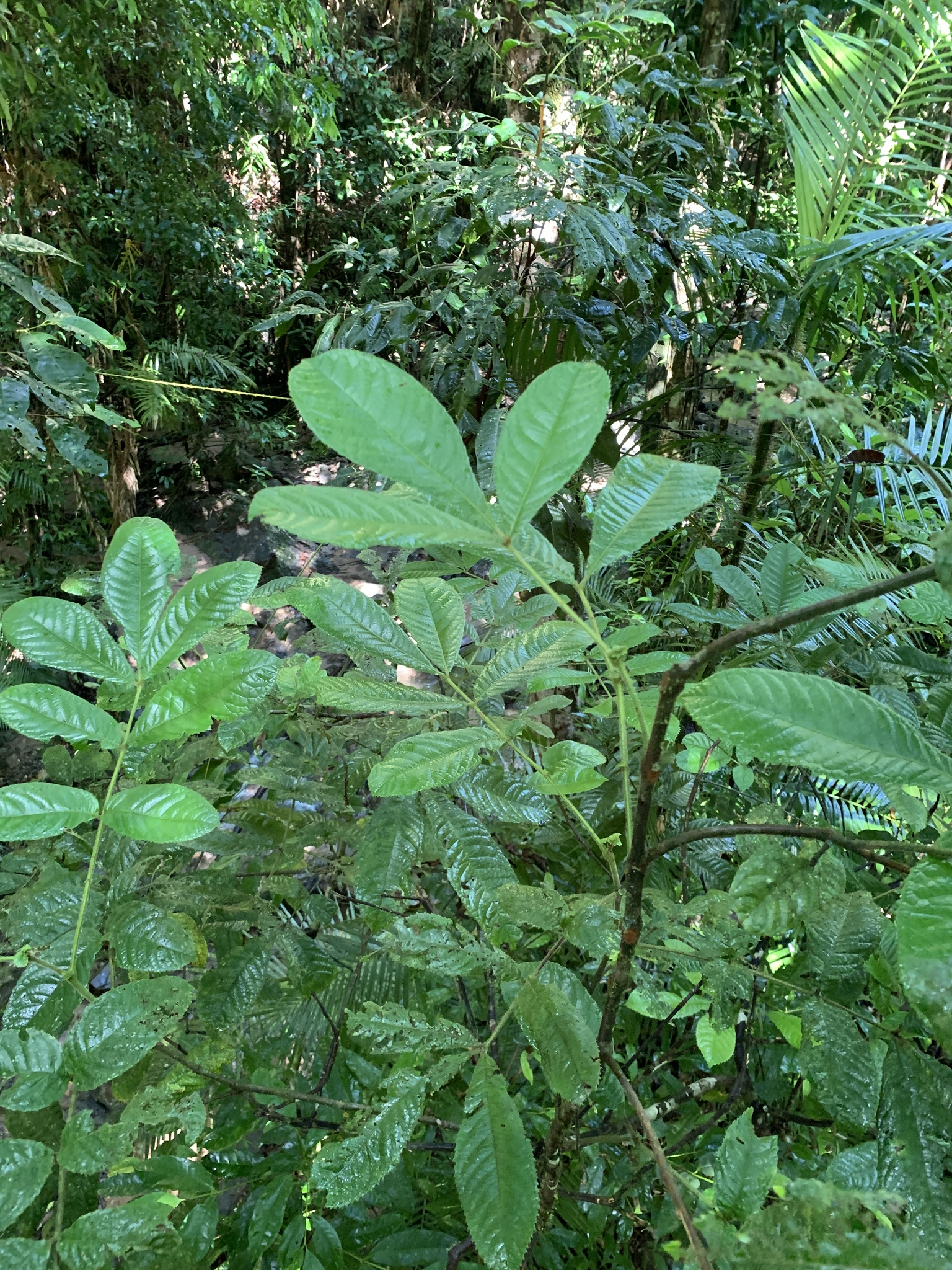
Habit

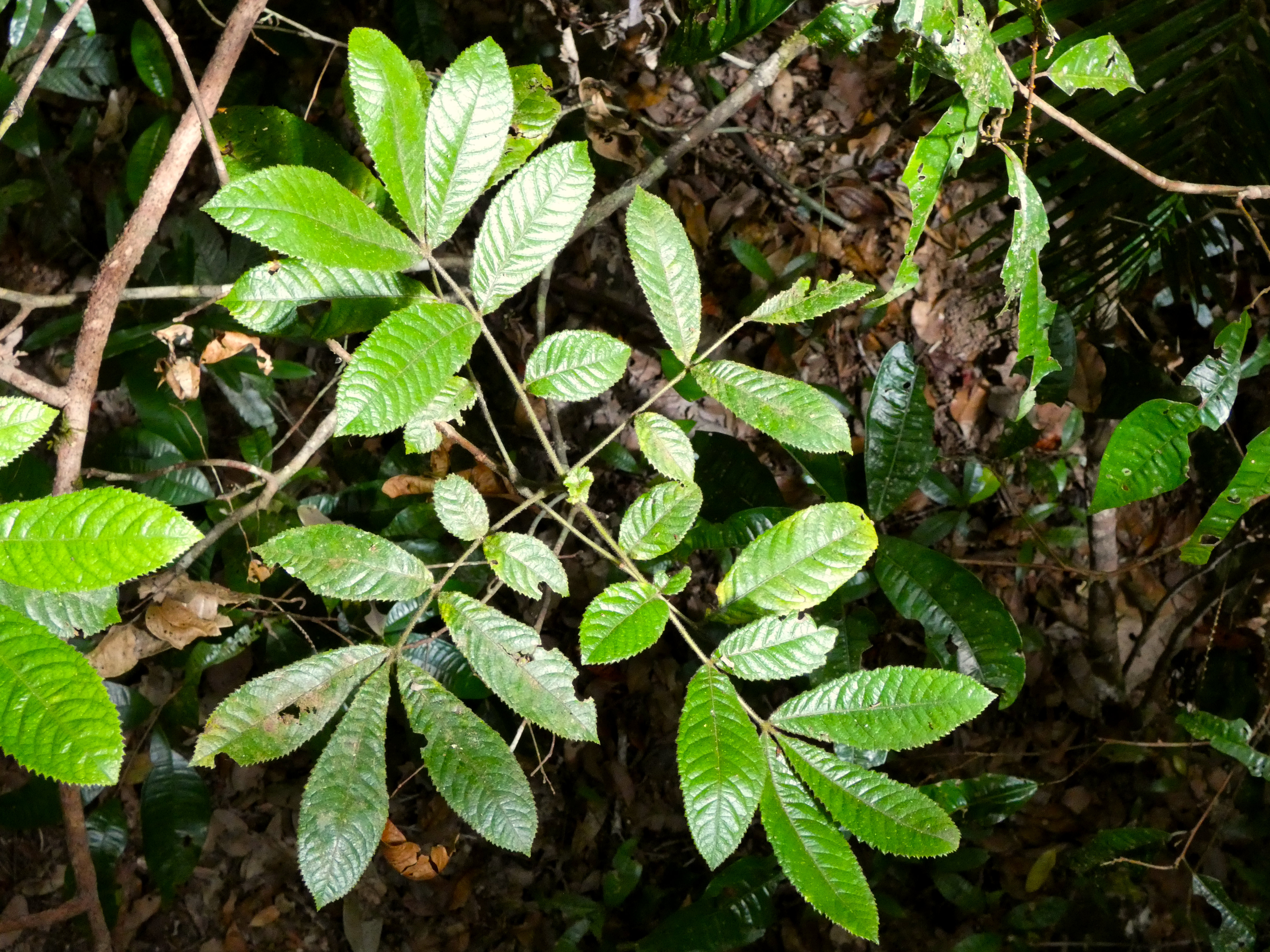
Foliage

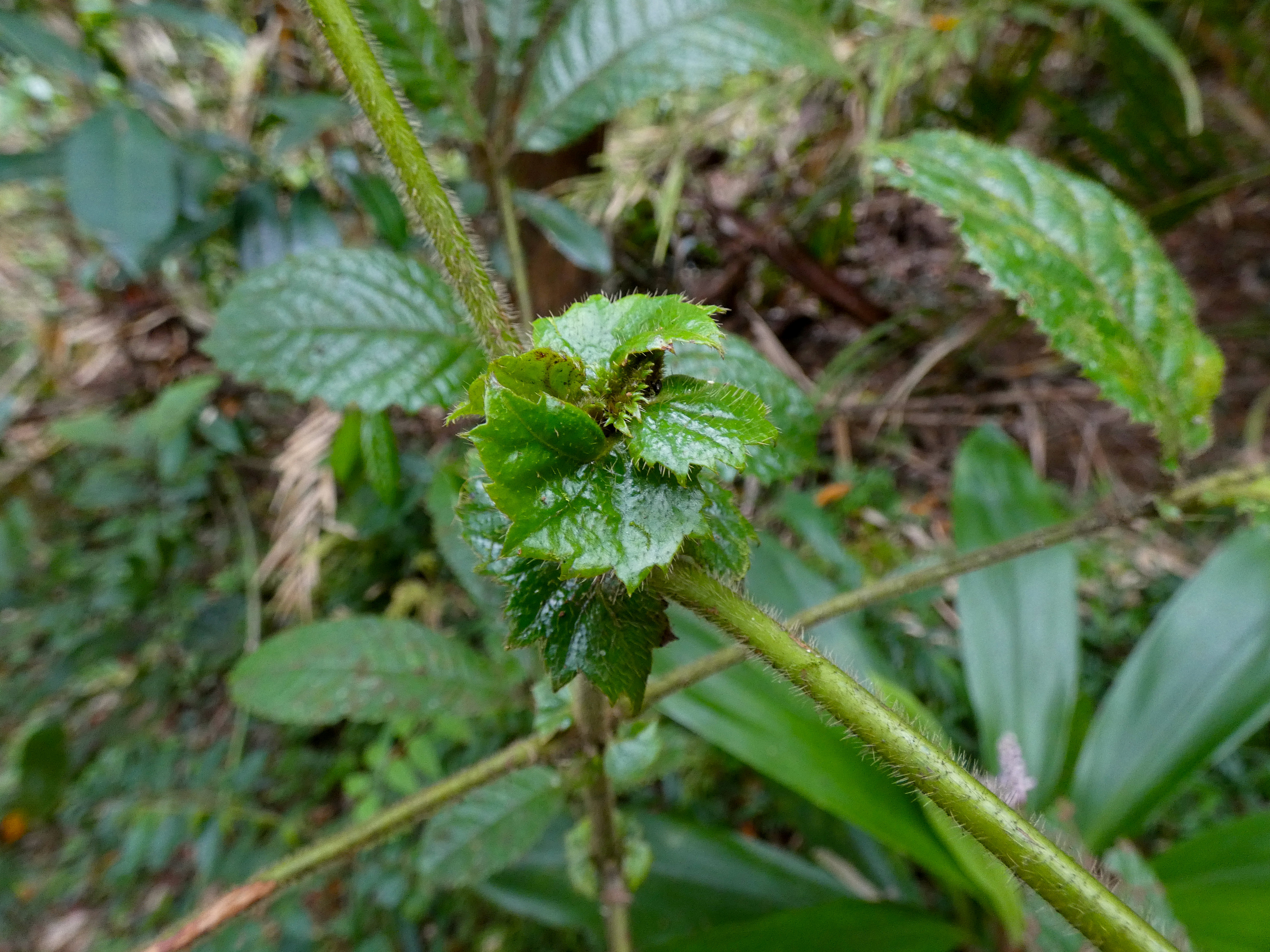
Stipules
