= Pancheria multijuga =

Conservation status
- Endangered (IUCN 3.1)

Scientific classification
- Kingdom: Plantae
- Clade: Tracheophytes
- Clade: Angiosperms
- Clade: Eudicots
- Clade: Rosids
- Order: Oxalidales
- Family: Cunoniaceae
- Genus: Pancheria
- Species: P. multijuga

Binomial name
- Pancheria multijuga Guillaumin

Species of shrub

Pancheria multijuga is a species of shrub in the family Cunoniaceae. It is endemic to New Caledonia, where it is rare and found only on a few mountains.
