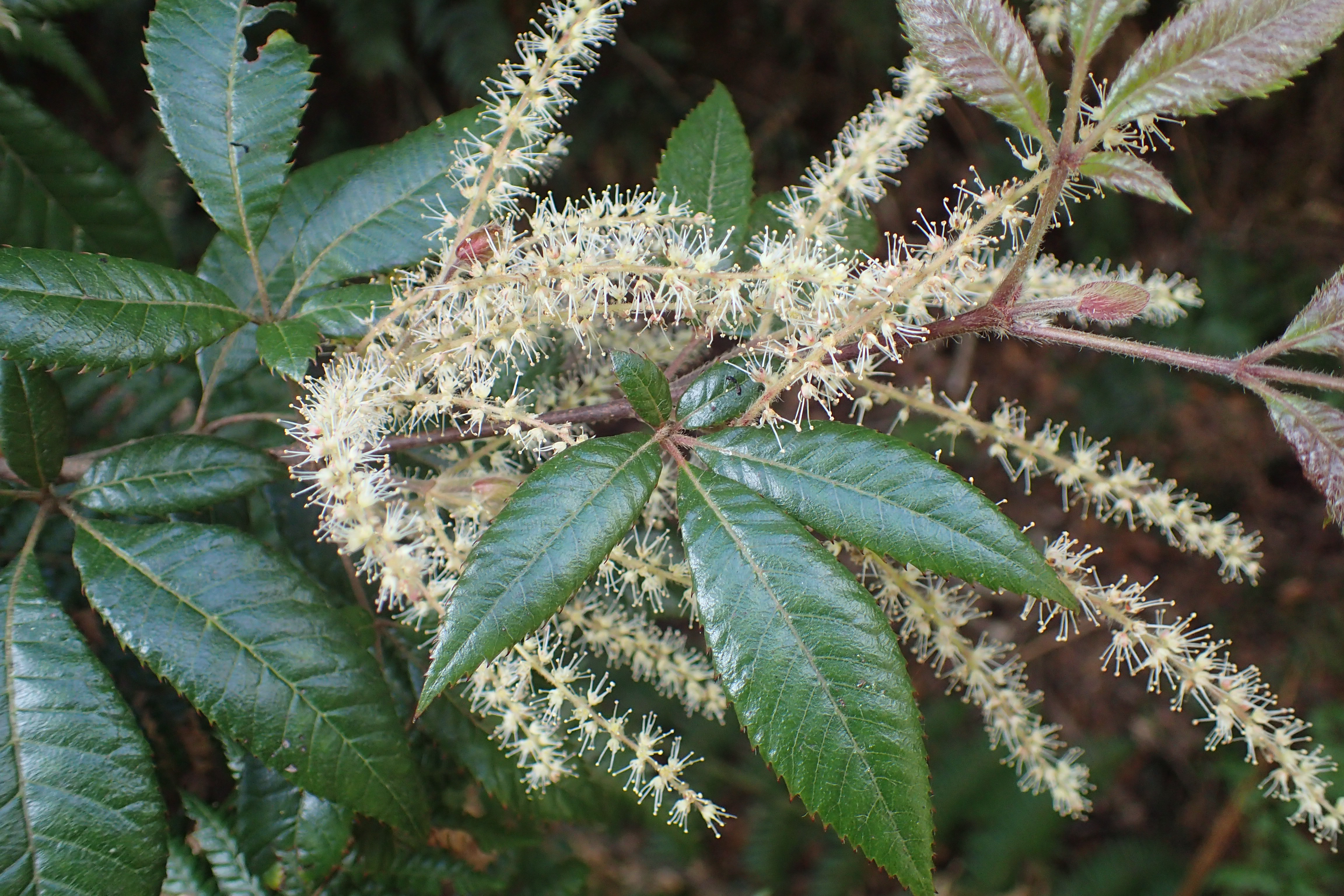
- Foliage and male flowers

Conservation status
- Least Concern (IUCN 3.1)

Scientific classification
- Kingdom: Plantae
- Clade: Tracheophytes
- Clade: Angiosperms
- Clade: Eudicots
- Clade: Rosids
- Order: Oxalidales
- Family: Cunoniaceae
- Genus: Vesselowskya
- Species: V. rubifolia

Binomial name
- Vesselowskya rubifolia (F.Muell.) Pamp.

Synonyms
- Geissois rubifolia F.Muell.; Weinmannia rubifolia (F.Muell.) Benth.; Windmannia rubifolia (F.Muell.) Kuntze

= Vesselowskya rubifolia =

Southern marara

Species of flowering plant

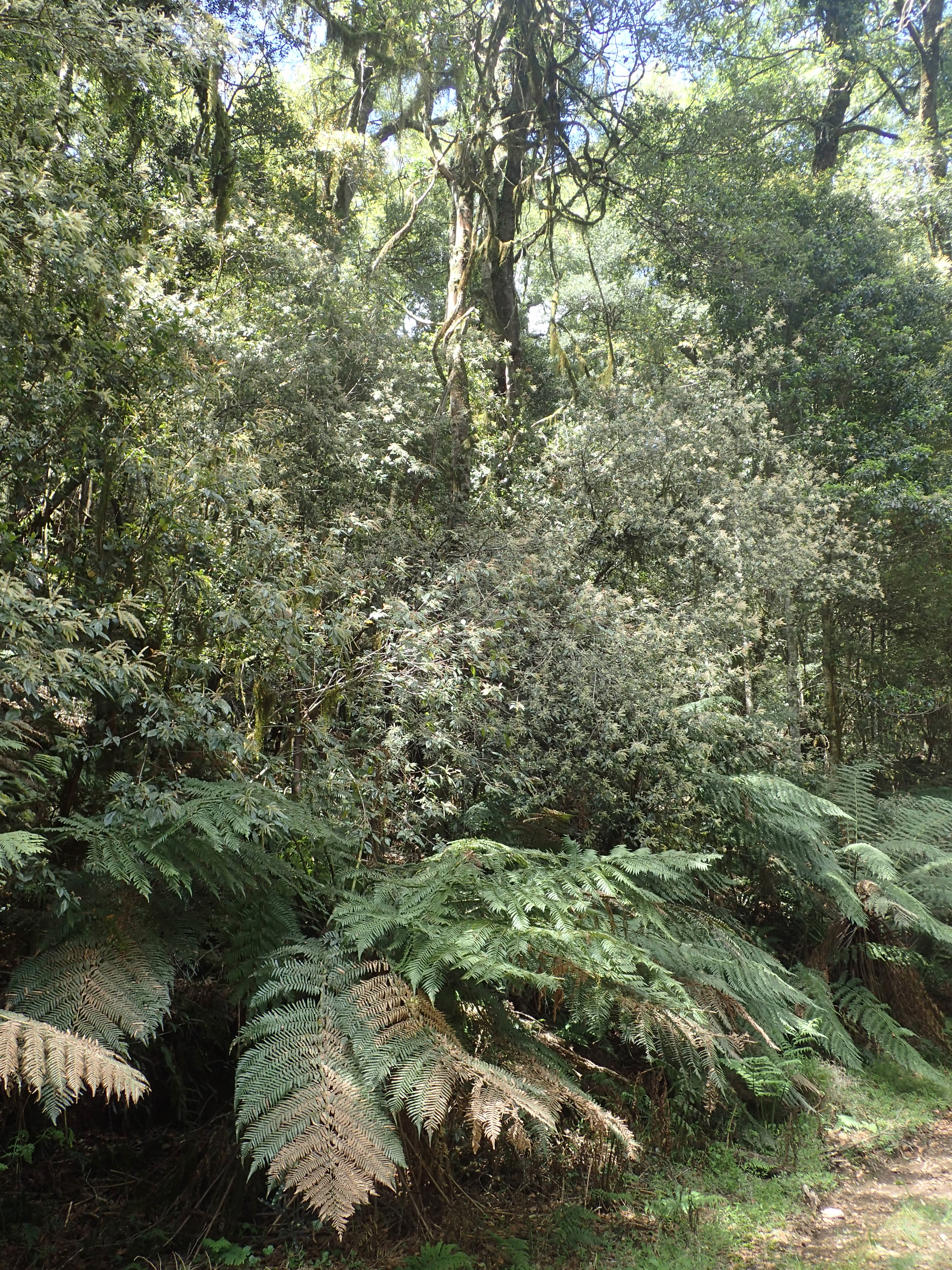
Habit in New England National Park

Vesselowskya rubifolia, commonly known as southern marara, red ash, mountain marara or Dorrigo southern marara, is a species of flowering plant in the family Cunoniaceae. It has a restricted distribution in eastern New South Wales, Australia. It is a shrub or small tree with compound leaves with three or five leaflets with serrated edges, and small whitish flowers arranged along a raceme.

== Description ==
Vesselowskya rubifolia is a shrub or tree that typically grows to a height of 6–8 m (20–26 ft) with a trunk up to 25 cm (9.8 in) in diameter, the bark thin and fawn brown. Its young growth, parts of the leaves and flowers are covered with long hairs flattened against the surface. The leaves are arranged in opposite pairs, each with three or five elliptical leaflets with sharply-pointed serrations on the edges, the leaflets all attached to a single point on the end of the petiole. The end leaflet is 40–120 mm (1.6–4.7 in) long and 20–40 mm (0.79–1.57 in) wide on a petiolule 8–11 mm (0.31–0.43 in) long, the side leaflets 30–70 mm (1.2–2.8 in) long and 15–25 mm (0.59–0.98 in) wide on a petiolule 2–4 mm (0.079–0.157 in) long. The two basal leaflets, when present, are 5–20 mm (0.20–0.79 in) long and 5–17 mm (0.20–0.67 in) wide and sessile or on a petiolule up to 2 mm (0.079 in) long.

Male and female flowers are arranged along separate racemes 40–80 mm (1.6–3.1 in) long in leaf axils, the female racemes elongating to 150 mm (5.9 in) long as the fruit develops. Each flower has three whitish sepals and three whitish petals about 1.5 mm (0.059 in) long. Flowering occurs in spring and the fruit is an oval, pale brown capsule about 3 mm (0.12 in) long maturing from March to August.

== Taxonomy ==
Southern marara was first formally described in 1860 by Ferdinand von Mueller in Fragmenta phytographiae Australiae and was given the name Geissois rubiflora, from specimens collected from Clouds Creek by Hermann Beckler. In 1905, Renato Pampanini changed the name to Vesselowskya rubifolia in the journal Annali di botanica.

== Distribution and habitat ==
Vesselowskya rubifolia is usually found in cool temperate rainforest with Antarctic beech and occurs from Barrington Tops to north-west of Dorrigo.
