= Pancheria robusta =

Conservation status
- Endangered (IUCN 3.1)

Scientific classification
- Kingdom: Plantae
- Clade: Tracheophytes
- Clade: Angiosperms
- Clade: Eudicots
- Clade: Rosids
- Order: Oxalidales
- Family: Cunoniaceae
- Genus: Pancheria
- Species: P. robusta

Binomial name
- Pancheria robusta Guillaumin

Species of shrub

Pancheria robusta is a species of shrub in the family Cunoniaceae. It is endemic to New Caledonia, where it is rare and found only on a few mountains.
