= Pullea =

Pullea may refer to:

- Pullea (plant), a plant genus in the family Cunoniaceae
- Pullea (mite), a mite genus in the family Carpoglyphidae
