= Pullea glabra =

Conservation status
- Least Concern (IUCN 3.1)

Scientific classification
- Kingdom: Plantae
- Clade: Tracheophytes
- Clade: Angiosperms
- Clade: Eudicots
- Clade: Rosids
- Order: Oxalidales
- Family: Cunoniaceae
- Genus: Pullea
- Species: P. glabra

Binomial name
- Pullea glabra Schltr.

Varieties
- Pullea glabra var. glabra; Pullea glabra var. verticillata Hoogland

Species of flowering plant

Pullea glabra is a species of flowering plant in the family Cunoniaceae. It is a tree native to Fiji (Viti Levu and Ovalau) and New Guinea including the Louisiade Archipelago, and possibly to Morotai in the Maluku Islands of Indonesia. It is a large canopy or sub-canopy tree growing 10 to 30 metres tall, native to primary lowland and montane forests from 200 to 2,500 metres elevation.

Two varieties are accepted.

- Pullea glabra var. glabra (synonyms Platylophus clemensiae L.M.Perry, Pullea decipiens L.M.Perry, P. papuana Gibbs, P. perryana A.C.Sm., and P. versteeghii L.M.Perry) – Fiji, New Guinea, and possibly Morotai in Maluku
- Pullea glabra var. verticillata Hoogland – eastern New Guinea
