= Pancheria humboldtiana =

Conservation status
- Near Threatened (IUCN 3.1)

Scientific classification
- Kingdom: Plantae
- Clade: Tracheophytes
- Clade: Angiosperms
- Clade: Eudicots
- Clade: Rosids
- Order: Oxalidales
- Family: Cunoniaceae
- Genus: Pancheria
- Species: P. humboldtiana

Binomial name
- Pancheria humboldtiana Guillaumin

Species of shrub

Pancheria humboldtiana is a species of shrub in the family Cunoniaceae. It is endemic to New Caledonia where it is rare and found only on a few mountains.
