= Platylophus =

Platylophus may refer to

- Platylophus (bird), a genus of birds in the family Platylophidae
- Platylophus (plant), a genus of plant in the family Cunoniaceae
- Platylophus (plant2), a taxonomic synonym of the plant genus Centaurea
