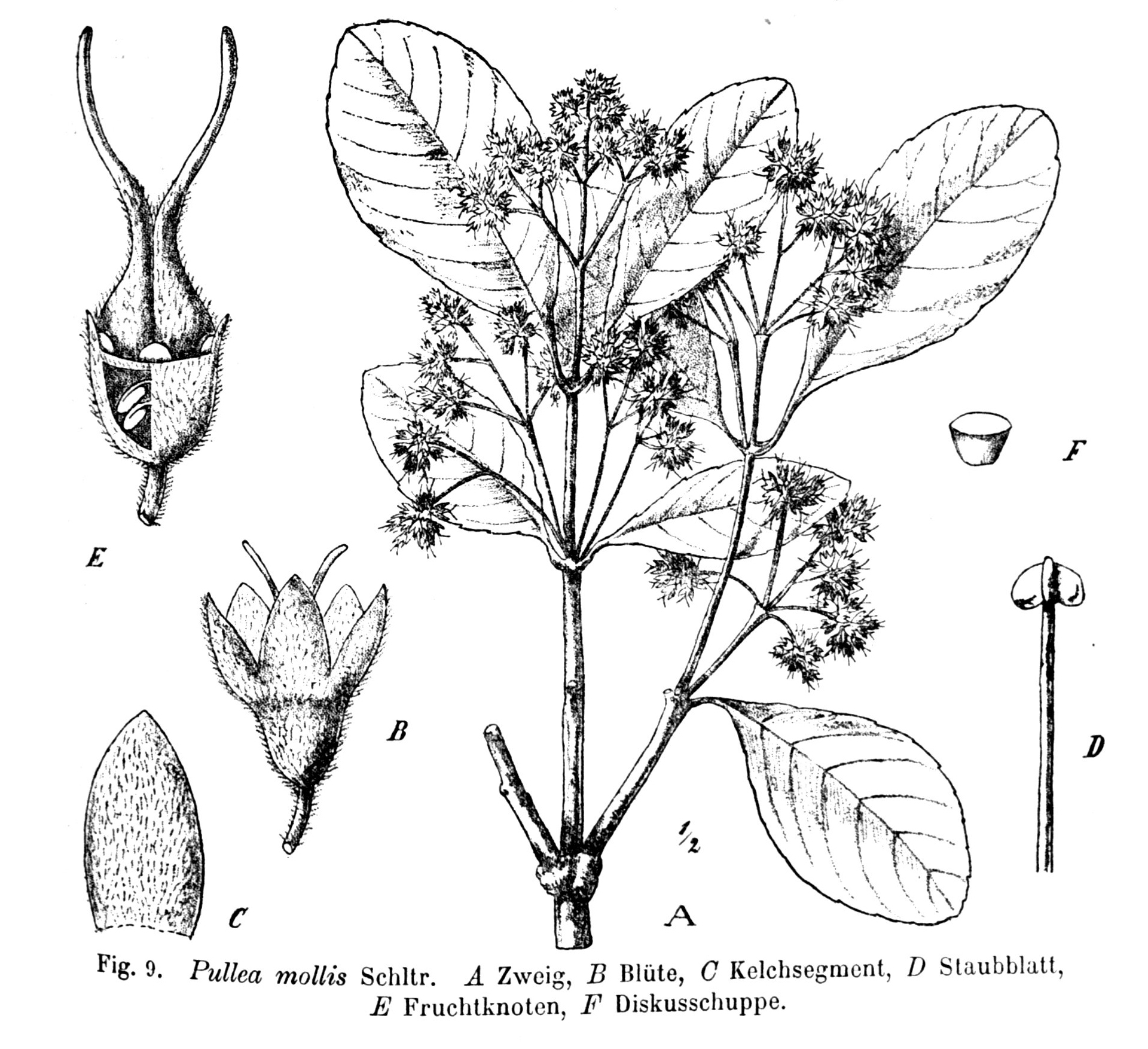

Conservation status
- Least Concern (IUCN 3.1)

Scientific classification
- Kingdom: Plantae
- Clade: Tracheophytes
- Clade: Angiosperms
- Clade: Eudicots
- Clade: Rosids
- Order: Oxalidales
- Family: Cunoniaceae
- Genus: Pullea
- Species: P. mollis

Binomial name
- Pullea mollis Schltr.

= Pullea mollis =

Species of flowering plant

Pullea mollis is a species of flowering plant in the family Cunoniaceae. It is a tree endemic to eastern New Guinea. It grows in montane rain forests.
