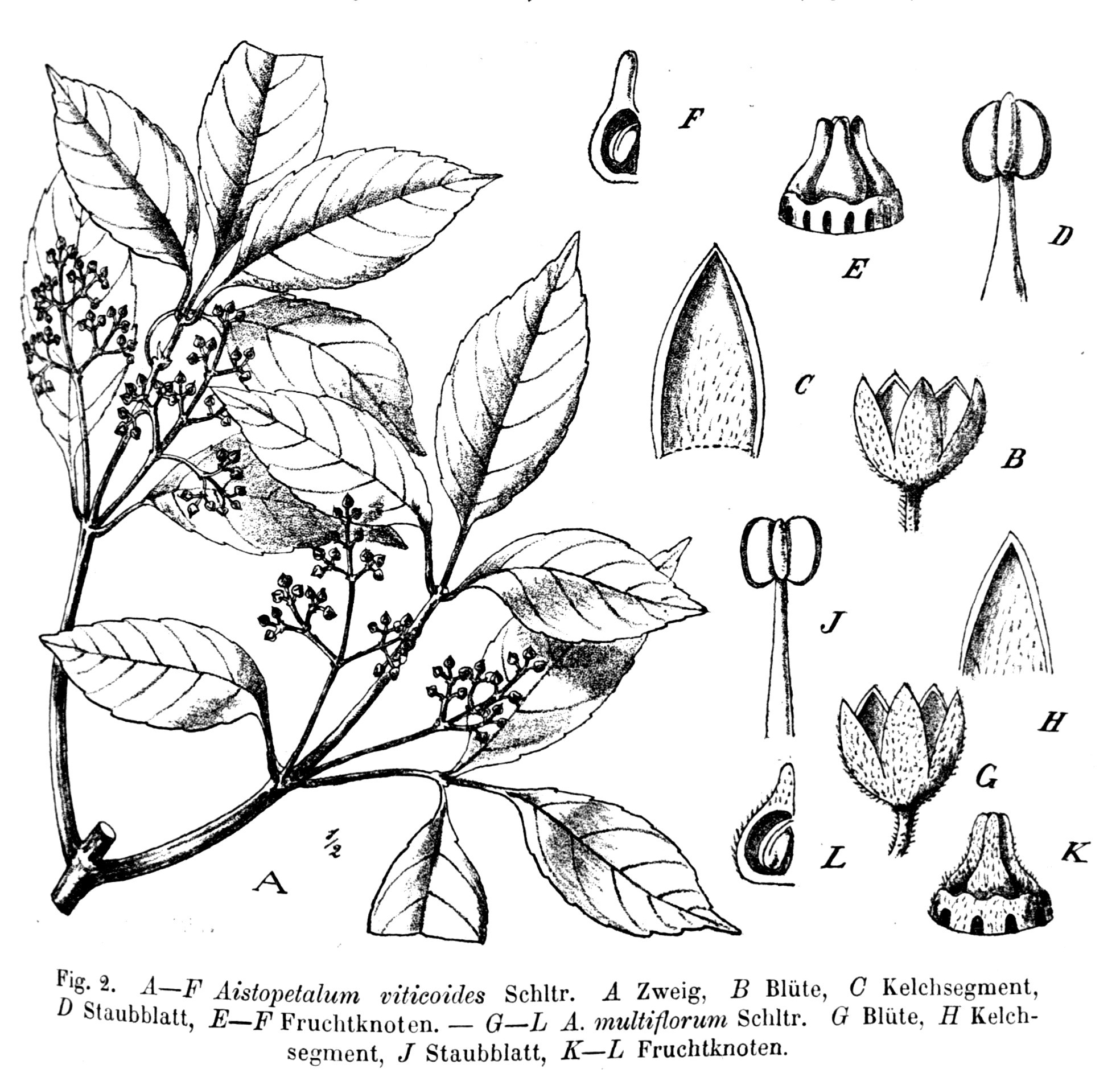
- Aistopetalum viticoides

Scientific classification
- Kingdom: Plantae
- Clade: Tracheophytes
- Clade: Angiosperms
- Clade: Eudicots
- Clade: Rosids
- Order: Oxalidales
- Family: Cunoniaceae
- Genus: Aistopetalum; Schltr.

= Aistopetalum =

Genus of flowering plants

Aistopetalum is a genus of trees in the family Cunoniaceae. It is endemic to New Guinea and includes two species: Aistopetalum multiflorum Schltr. and Aistopetalum viticoides Schltr..
