= Spiraeopsis =

Scientific classification
- Kingdom: Plantae
- Clade: Tracheophytes
- Clade: Angiosperms
- Clade: Eudicots
- Clade: Rosids
- Order: Oxalidales
- Family: Cunoniaceae
- Genus: Spiraeopsis; Miq.

Species
- See text.

Synonyms
- Betchea Schltr.; Dirhynchosia Blume

Genus of flowering plants

Spiraeopsis is a genus of flowering plant in the family Cunoniaceae, native to eastern tropical Asia. The genus was first described by Friedrich Miquel in 1856.

== Species ==
As of April 2021, Plants of the World Online accepted the following species:

- Spiraeopsis brassii L.M.Perry
- Spiraeopsis celebica (Blume) Miq.
- Spiraeopsis clemensiae L.M.Perry
- Spiraeopsis fulva (Schltr.) L.M.Perry
- Spiraeopsis papuana (Pulle) L.M.Perry
- Spiraeopsis rufa (Schltr.) L.M.Perry
