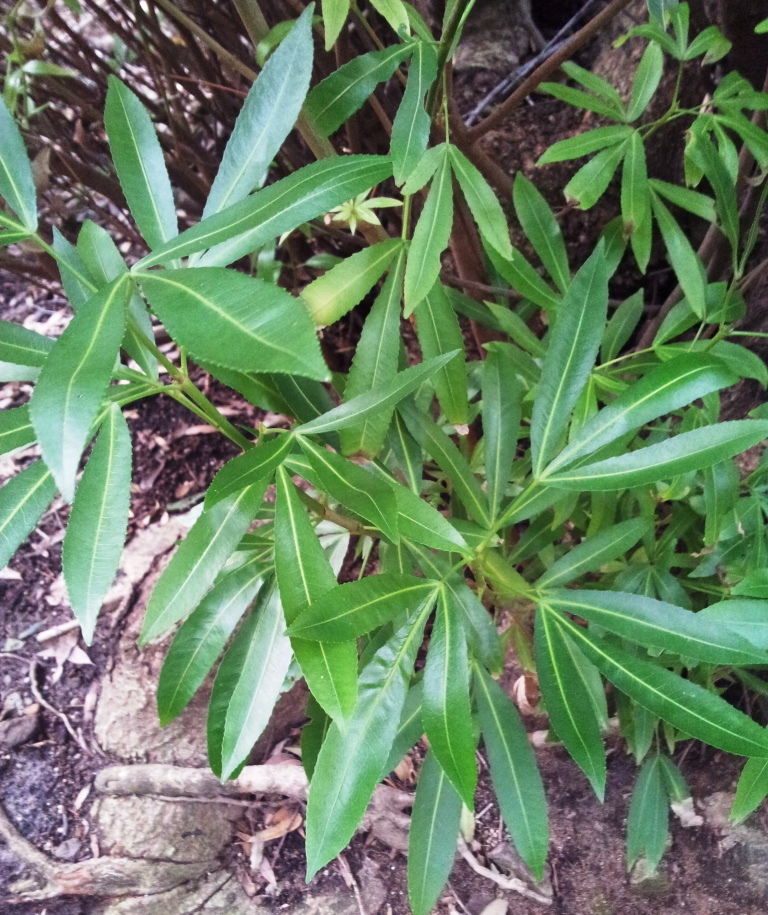

Conservation status
- Least Concern (IUCN 3.1)

Scientific classification
- Kingdom: Plantae
- Clade: Tracheophytes
- Clade: Angiosperms
- Clade: Eudicots
- Clade: Rosids
- Order: Oxalidales
- Family: Cunoniaceae
- Genus: Platylophus; D.Don
- Species: P. trifoliatus

Binomial name
- Platylophus trifoliatus (L.f.) D.Don

Synonyms
- Trimerisma trifoliatum (L.f.) C.Presl; Weinmannia trifoliata L.f.

= Platylophus trifoliatus =

Species of tree

Platylophus trifoliatus is a species of tree in the family Cunoniaceae. It is endemic to the Cape Provinces of South Africa and the only species of the genus Platylophus. Leaves are opposite with three leaflets. Flowers are creamish or yellowish and arranged in axillary thyrsoid inflorescences. Fruits are indehiscent. Its closest relative is the Tasmanian endemic Anodopetalum.
