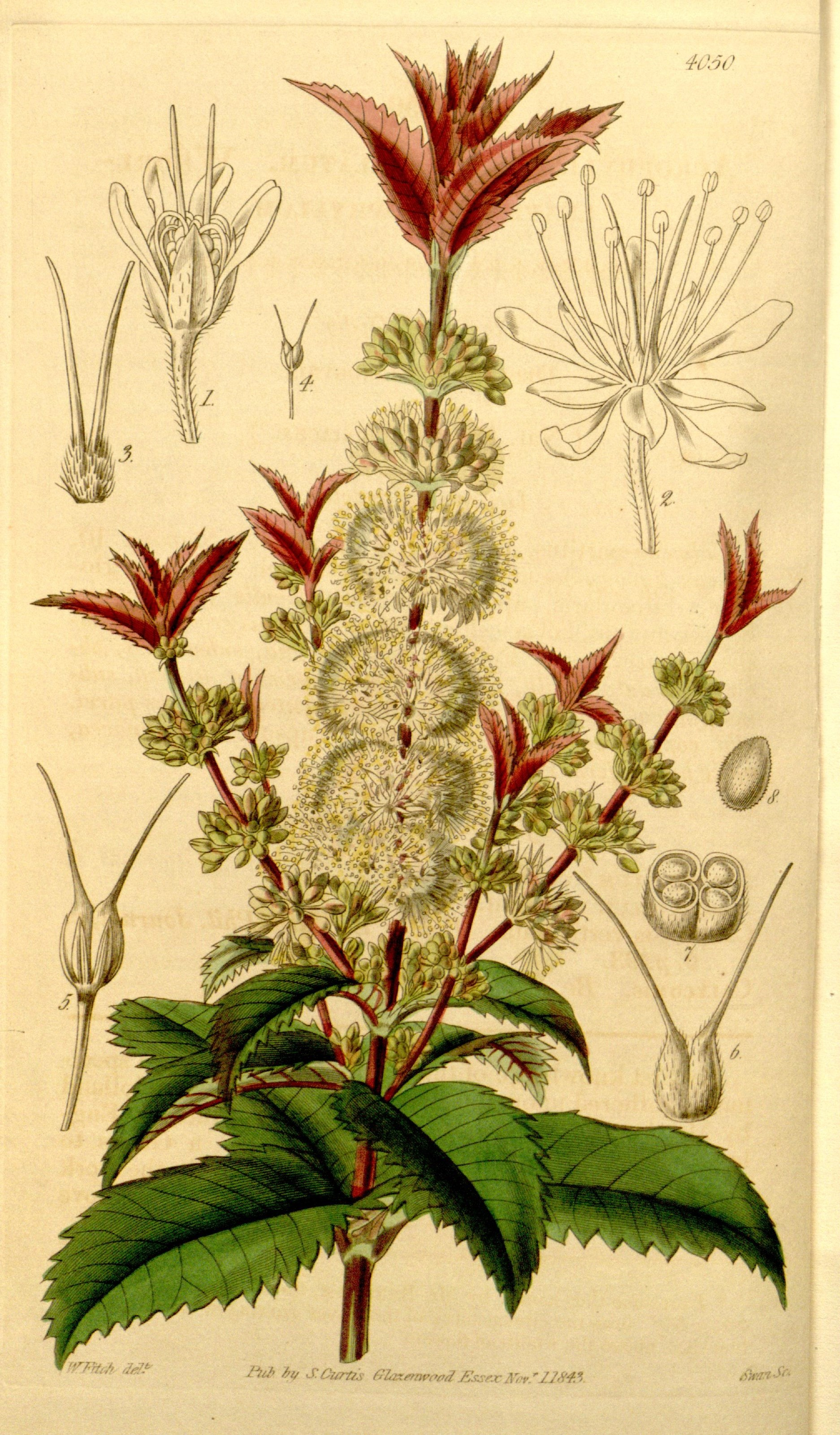

Conservation status
- Vulnerable (EPBC Act)

Scientific classification
- Kingdom: Plantae
- Clade: Embryophytes
- Clade: Tracheophytes
- Clade: Angiosperms
- Clade: Eudicots
- Clade: Rosids
- Order: Oxalidales
- Family: Cunoniaceae
- Genus: Acrophyllum; Benth.
- Species: A. australe

Binomial name
- Acrophyllum australe (A.Cunn.) Hoogland

= Acrophyllum australe =

Species of flowering plant

Acrophyllum australe is a woody flowering plant, native to a small area of New South Wales, Australia. A. australe is listed as a vulnerable species in the wild, by the Australian Department of the Environment and Heritage (DEH).

The plant has small, shiny, heavily serrated leaves. The flowers are small, white and inconspicuous, growing from the purplish stems. It is an evergreen shrub, and has been cultivated for gardening.

The genus Acrophyllum is monotypic, and is grouped within the family Cunoniaceae. Synonyms for the genus name include Calycomis D.Don. Synonyms for the species include Acrophyllum venosum, Acrophyllum verticillatum, and Weinmannia australis.
