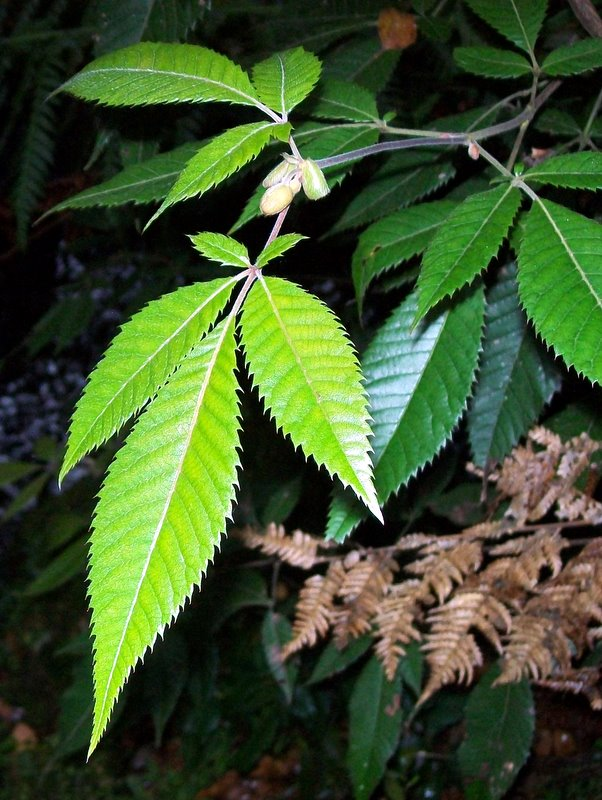
- Vesselowskya venusta at Barrington Tops National Park, Australia

Scientific classification
- Kingdom: Plantae
- Clade: Tracheophytes
- Clade: Angiosperms
- Clade: Eudicots
- Clade: Rosids
- Order: Oxalidales
- Family: Cunoniaceae
- Genus: Vesselowskya; Pamp. (1905)

Species
- Vesselowskya rubifolia (F.Muell.) Pamp.; Vesselowskya venusta Rozefelds, R.W.Barnes & Pellow

= Vesselowskya =

Genus of shrubs

Vesselowskya is a genus of flowering plants in the family Cunoniaceae. It includes two species of shrubs to small trees native to New South Wales and southeastern Queensland in eastern Australia. They are found in cool, temperate mountain ranges, normally in country dominated by Nothofagus moorei forests. The common name for these plants is marara.
