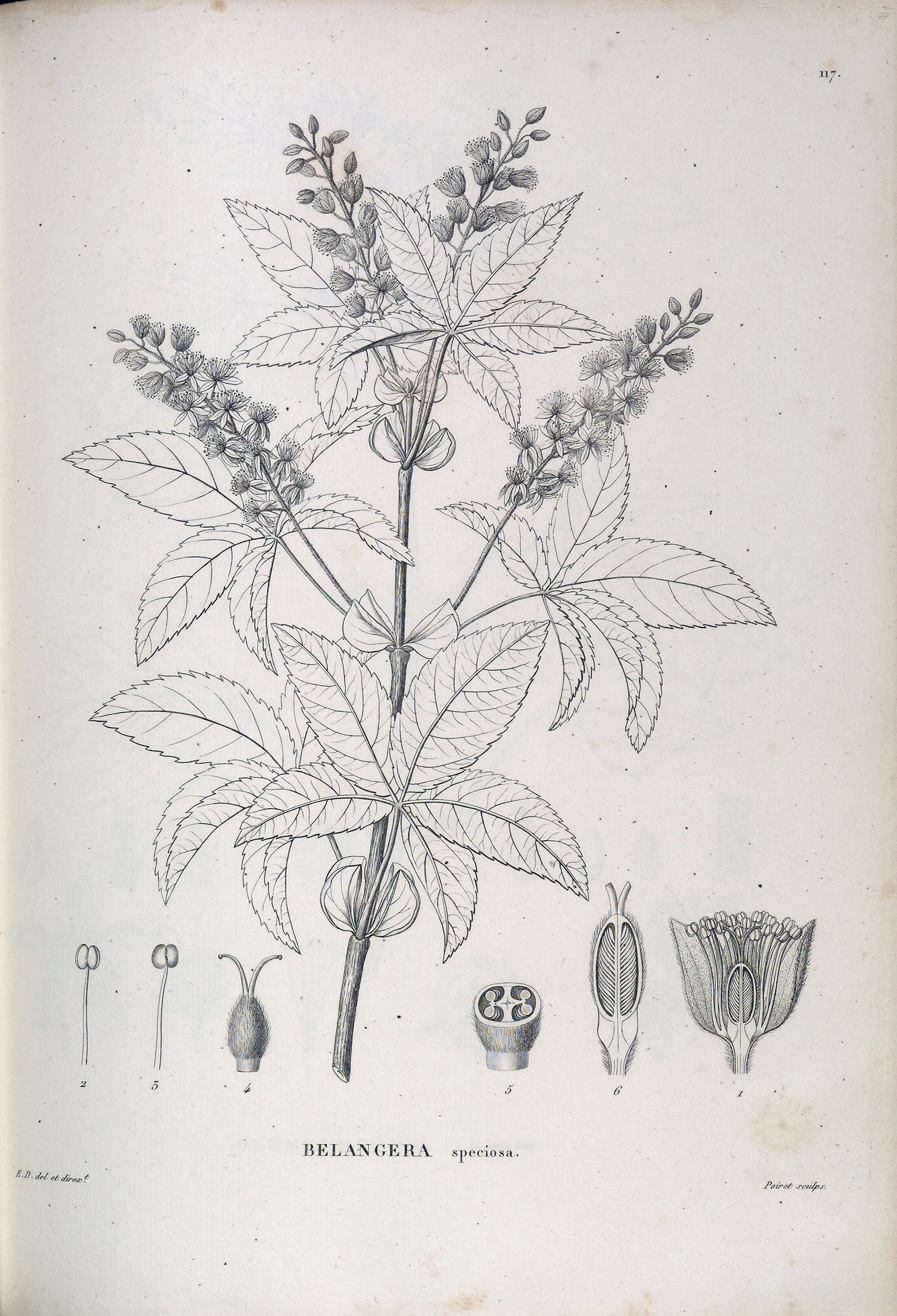
- Lamanonia speciosa

Scientific classification
- Kingdom: Plantae
- Clade: Tracheophytes
- Clade: Angiosperms
- Clade: Eudicots
- Clade: Rosids
- Order: Oxalidales
- Family: Cunoniaceae
- Genus: Lamanonia; Vell.

Synonyms
- Belangera Cambess.; Polystemon D.Don

= Lamanonia =

Genus of trees

Lamanonia is a genus of trees in the family Cunoniaceae. It is endemic to South America.

It is found in north eastern Argentina, Brazil and Paraguay.

== Species ==
- Lamanonia brasiliensis Zickel & Leitão
- Lamanonia chabertii (Pamp.) L.B.Sm.
- Lamanonia cuneata (Cambess.) Kuntze
- Lamanonia speciosa (Cambess.) L.B.Sm.
- Lamanonia ternata Vell.
- Lamanonia ulei (Engl.) L.B.Sm.

The genus name of Lamanonia is in honour of Robert de Lamanon (1752–1787), a French botanist, physicist, geologist and meteorologist. It was first described and published in Fl. Flumin. on page 228 in 1829.
