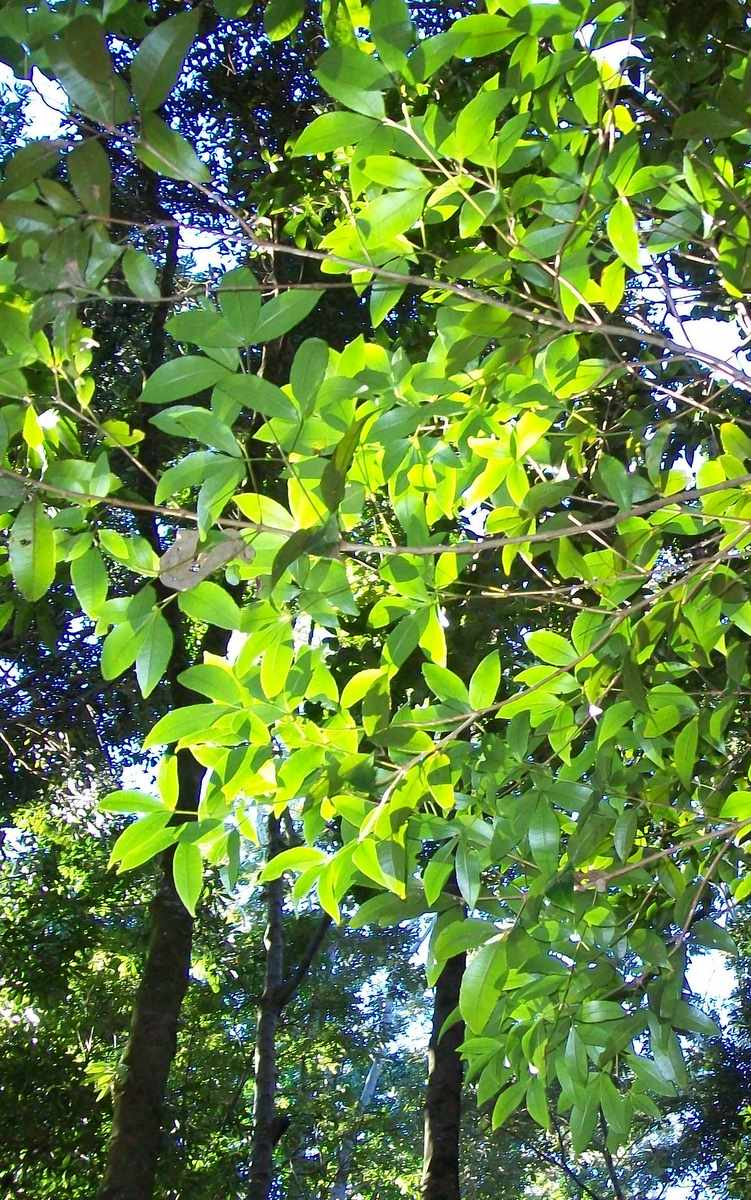
- Pseudoweinmannia lachnocarpa

Scientific classification
- Kingdom: Plantae
- Clade: Tracheophytes
- Clade: Angiosperms
- Clade: Eudicots
- Clade: Rosids
- Order: Oxalidales
- Family: Cunoniaceae
- Genus: Pseudoweinmannia; Engl.

Species
- Pseudoweinmannia apetala (F.M.Bailey) Engl.; Pseudoweinmannia lachnocarpa (F.Muell.) Engl.

= Pseudoweinmannia =

Genus of trees

Pseudoweinmannia is a genus of plants in the family Cunoniaceae endemic to Australia. It includes two species, both of which inhabit rainforest on the east coast. Both species were initially placed in the genus Weinmannia.

== Description ==
The two species of Pseudoweinmannia consist of small to large trees often displaying buttress roots. The compound leaves are opposite and have three stemless leaflets with toothed margins. Stipules are long and narrow. Inflorescences are generally racemose but may be a more complex structure on older specimens. Flowers are without petals; the sepals are usually six in number and measure about 2–3 mm (0.08–0.12 in) long. The fruit are small capsules about 3–5 mm (0.12–0.20 in) long and densely covered in gold or brown hairs.

== Distribution ==
P. apetala occurs in northeast Queensland from about Rossville to about Cardstone, occupying drier forms of rainforest from sea level to about 800 m (2,600 ft). P. lachnocarpa is found in subtropical rainforest from about Tinana in southeast Queensland to Casino in northeast New South Wales, at altitudes from sea level to 1,000 m (3,300 ft).

== Taxonomy ==
Both species were originally placed in the genus Weinmannia. In 1930, German botanist Adolf Engler transferred them to their current positions.
