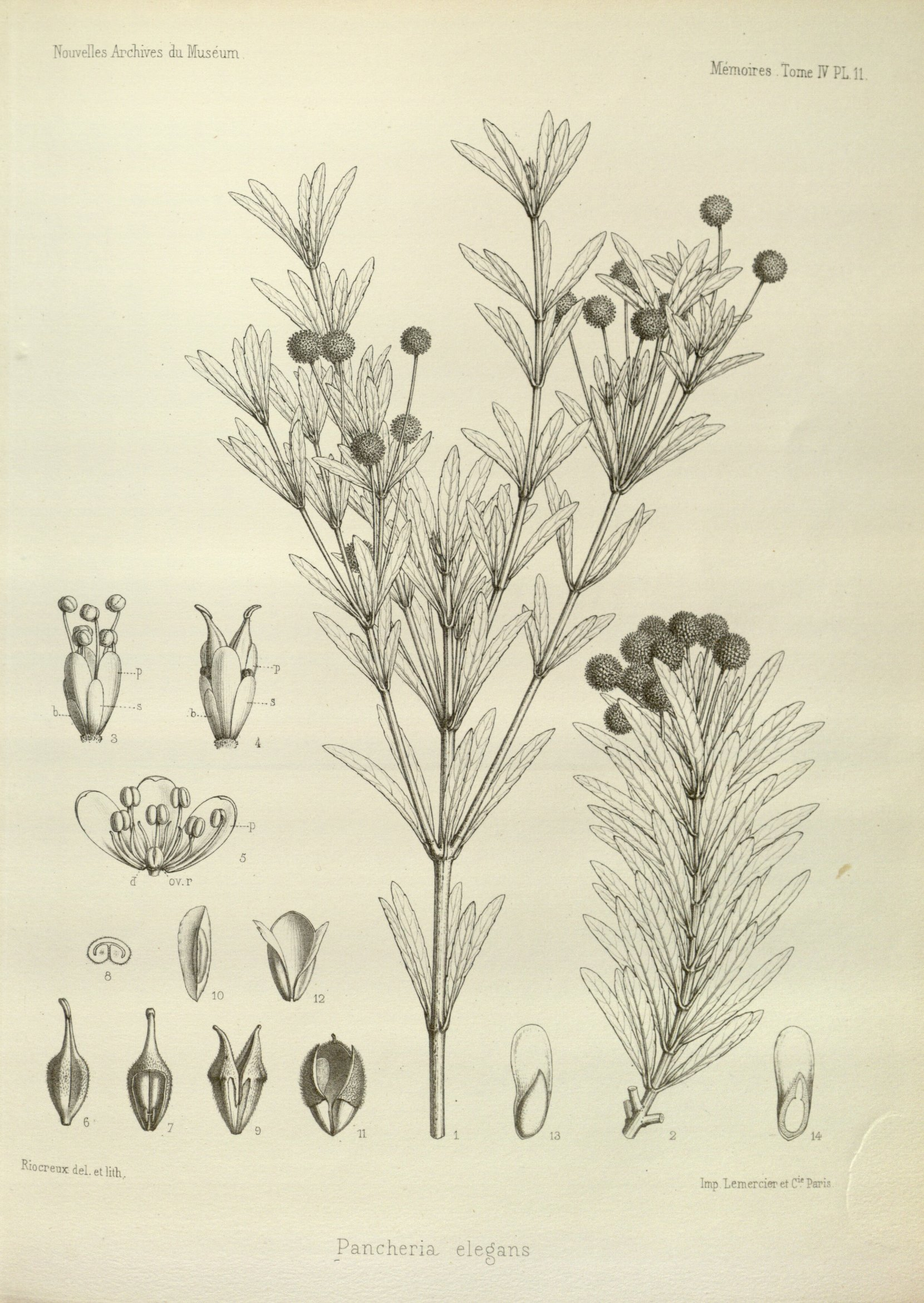
- Pancheria elegans

Scientific classification
- Kingdom: Plantae
- Clade: Tracheophytes
- Clade: Angiosperms
- Clade: Eudicots
- Clade: Rosids
- Order: Oxalidales
- Family: Cunoniaceae
- Genus: Pancheria; Brongn. & Gris

= Pancheria =

Genus of flowering plants

Pancheria is a genus of shrubs and trees in the family Cunoniaceae. It is to endemic to New Caledonia and contains 27 species. Leaves or whorled (or opposite in Pancheria confusa), simple or pinnate. The flowers are arranged in capitula, fruits are follicular. The species are dioecious. The genus is well diversified on ultramafic rocks and some species are nickel hyperaccumulators. It is related to Cunonia and Pterophylla. It was named after Jean Armand Isidore Pancher.

== List of species ==
(all endemic to New Caledonia)

- Pancheria ajiearoana H.C. Hopkins, Pillon & J. Bradford
- Pancheria alaternoides Brongn. & Gris
- Pancheria beauverdiana Pamp.
- Pancheria billardieri (D. Don) Pamp.
- Pancheria brunhesii Pamp.
- Pancheria calophylla Guillaumin
- Pancheria communis Baker f.
- Pancheria confusa Guillaumin
- Pancheria dognyensis H.C. Hopkins, Pillon & J. Bradford
- Pancheria elegans Brongn. & Gris
- Pancheria engleriana Schltr.
- Pancheria ferruginea Brongn. & Gris
- Pancheria gatopensis Guillaumin
- Pancheria × heterophylla Vieill. ex Guillaumin
- Pancheria hirsuta Vieill. ex Pamp.
- Pancheria humboldtiana Guillaumin ex H.C. Hopkins & J. Bradford
- Pancheria × lanceolata (Pamp.) Baker f.
- Pancheria mcphersonii H.C. Hopkins, Pillon & J. Bradford
- Pancheria minima J. Bradford
- Pancheria multijuga Guillaumin ex H.C. Hopkins & J. Bradford
- Pancheria ouaiemensis J. Bradford
- Pancheria phillyreoides Brongn. & Gris ex Guillaumin
- Pancheria reticulata Guillaumin
- Pancheria robusta Guillaumin
- Pancheria rubrivenia Baker f.
- Pancheria ternata Brongn. & Gris
- Pancheria xaragurensis H.C. Hopkins & Pillon
