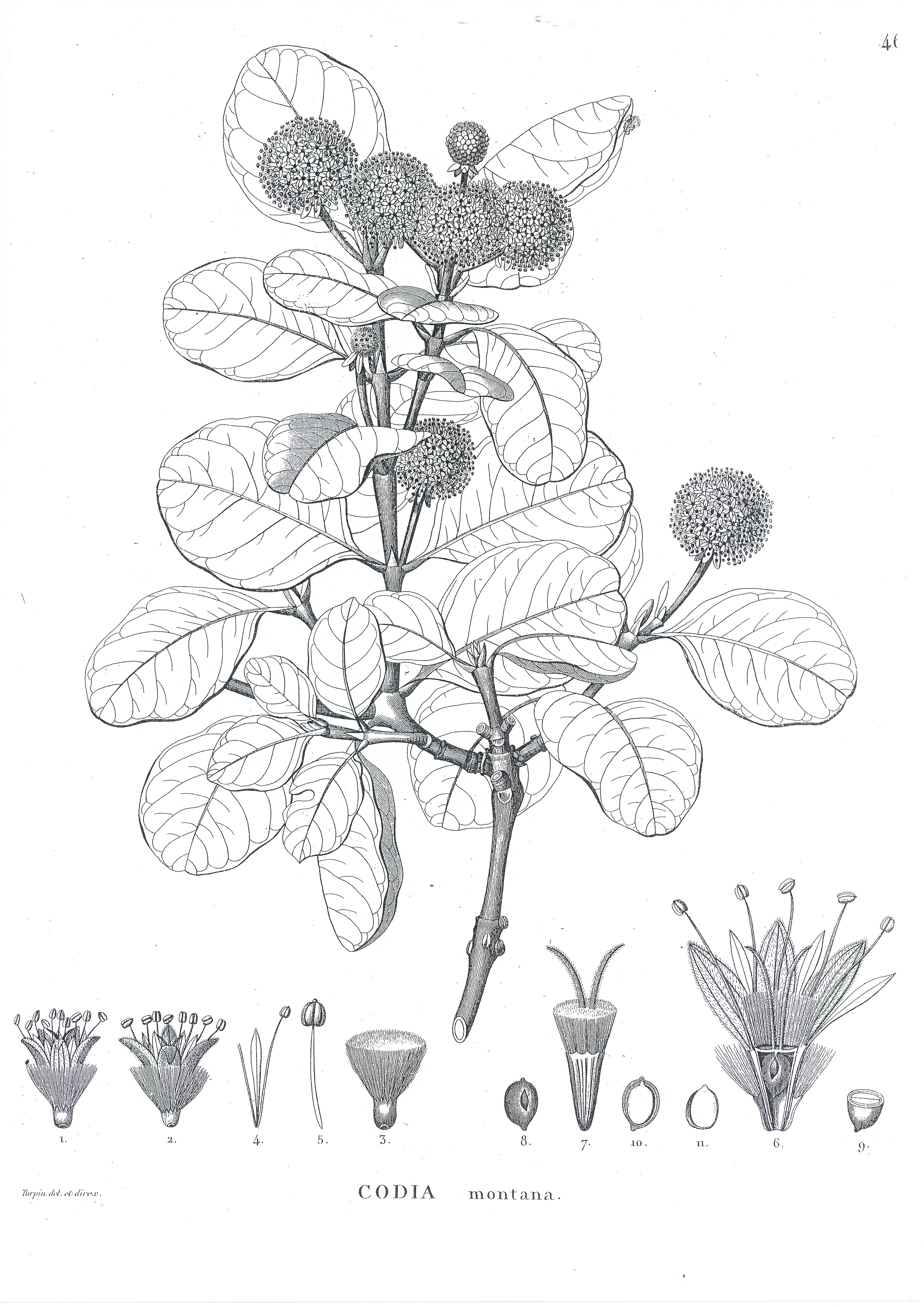
- Codia montana

Scientific classification
- Kingdom: Plantae
- Clade: Tracheophytes
- Clade: Angiosperms
- Clade: Eudicots
- Clade: Rosids
- Order: Oxalidales
- Family: Cunoniaceae
- Genus: Codia; J.R.Forst. & G.Forst.

Synonyms
- Pfeifferago Kuntze

= Codia =

Genus of flowering plants

Codia is a genus of trees and shrubs in the family Cunoniaceae. The genus is endemic to New Caledonia in the Pacific and contains 15 species. The leaves are opposite or whorled, simple, and the margin usually entire. The flowers are arranged in capitula. The ovary is inferior. The fruit is indehiscent and is covered with woolly hairs.

An extinct species of Codia, C. australiensis, has been found as a fossil in Australia, resembling the juvenile foliage of a living species in the genus. Codia is most closely related to the Australian Callicoma serratifolia.

== List of species ==
(all endemic to New Caledonia)

- Codia albicans Vieill. ex Pamp.
- Codia albifrons (Brongn. ex Schinz & Guillaumin) Baker f.
- Codia belepensis H.C. Hopkins
- Codia discolor (Brongn. & Gris) Guillaumin
- Codia ferruginea Brongn. & Gris
- Codia fusca (Schltr.) H.C. Hopkins
- Codia incrassata Pamp.
- Codia jaffrei H.C. Hopkins & B. Fogliani
- Codia mackeeana H.C. Hopkins & B. Fogliani
- Codia microphylla Vieill. ex Guillaumin
- Codia montana J.R.Forst. & G.Forst.
- Codia nitida Schltr.
- Codia spatulata Brongn. & Gris
- Codia triverticillata H.C. Hopkins & Pillon
- Codia xerophila Pillon, H.C. Hopkins & Gâteblé
