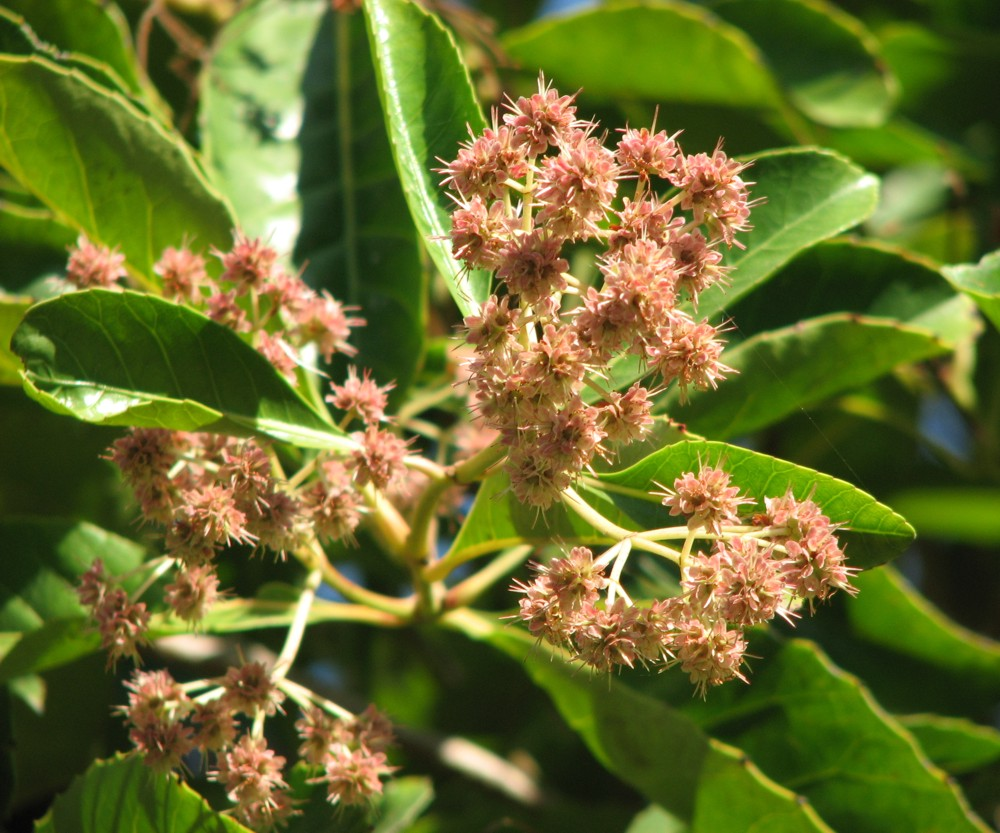
- Pullea stutzeri

Scientific classification
- Kingdom: Plantae
- Clade: Embryophytes
- Clade: Tracheophytes
- Clade: Spermatophytes
- Clade: Angiosperms
- Clade: Eudicots
- Clade: Rosids
- Order: Oxalidales
- Family: Cunoniaceae
- Genus: Pullea; Schltr.

Species
- Pullea glabra Schltr.; Pullea mollis Schltr.; Pullea stutzeri (F.Muell.) Gibbs

Synonyms
- Stutzeria F.Muell.

= Pullea (plant) =

Genus of trees

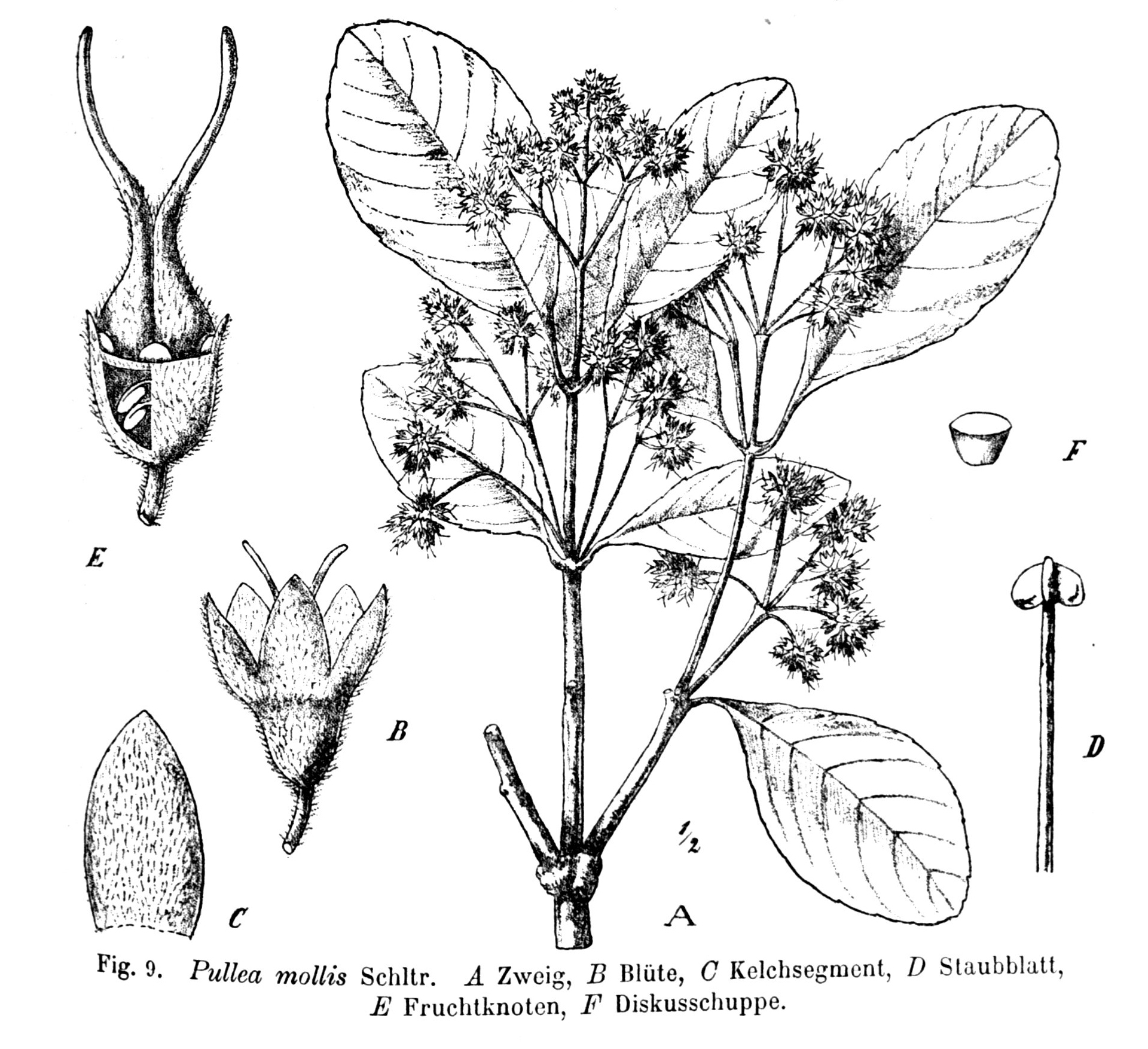
Pullea mollis

Pullea is a genus of trees of the family Cunoniaceae, with species found growing naturally in New Guinea, Fiji, and the wet tropical rainforests of north eastern Queensland, Australia.

Three species are accepted.

- Pullea glabra Schltr. – Fiji, New Guinea, and possibly Morotai in the Maluku Islands
- Pullea mollis Schltr. – eastern New Guinea
- Pullea stutzeri (F.Muell.) Gibbs – Queensland wet tropical rainforests endemic, Australia
