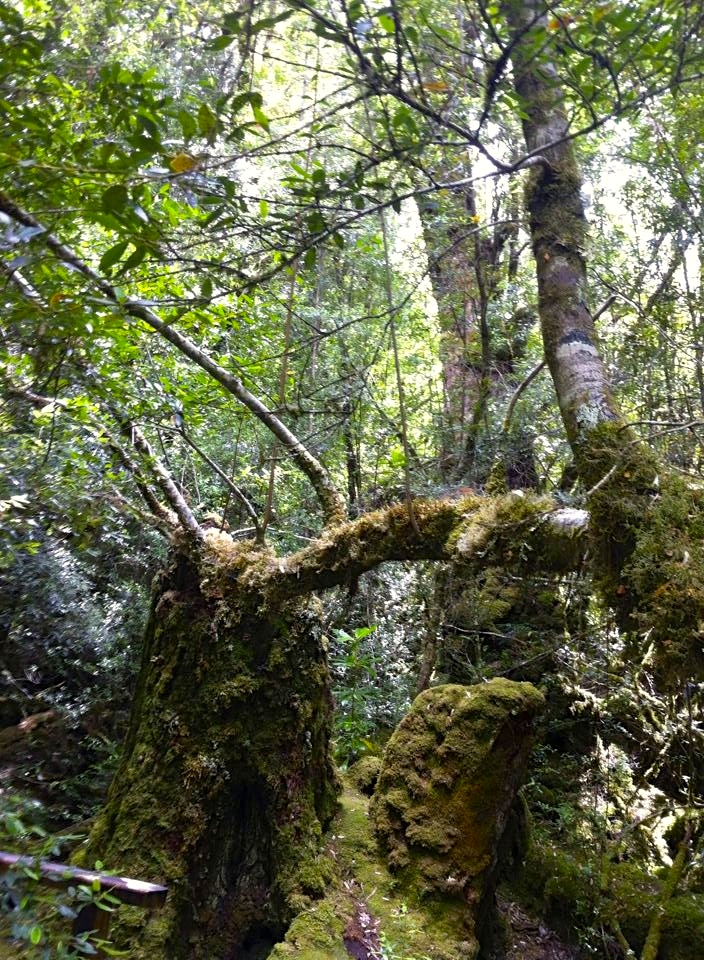
- Displaying its 'horizontal' growth habit

Conservation status
- Least Concern (IUCN 3.1)

Scientific classification
- Kingdom: Plantae
- Clade: Tracheophytes
- Clade: Angiosperms
- Clade: Eudicots
- Clade: Rosids
- Order: Oxalidales
- Family: Cunoniaceae
- Genus: Anodopetalum; A.Cunn. ex Endl.
- Species: A. biglandulosum

Binomial name
- Anodopetalum biglandulosum (Hook.) Hook.f.

= Anodopetalum =

Genus of flowering plants

Anodopetalum biglandulosum is a Tasmanian endemic shrub or small tree species that is a common component of Tasmania's cool temperate rainforests. It is commonly known as horizontal or horizontal scrub because of its habit of growth. It is the sole species in the genus Anodopetalum.

== Morphology ==
=== Growth form ===
Anodopetalum biglandulosum is commonly known as horizontal scrub due to the habit of its slender trunk (primary shoot) bending down horizontally under its own weight. This fallen stem sends vertical branches up its length (secondary shoots), which in turn bend down and branches arise (tertiary shoots), forming an impenetrable horizontal scrub. The creation of light gaps in the canopy changes light intensity, causing dormant buds at the branch nodes to overcome apical dominance and produce secondary and tertiary shoots. Vegetative reproduction is the main mode of regeneration in A. biglandulosum. The species is commonly less than 8m in height but can grow up to 12m tall in deep soiled, sheltered gullies.

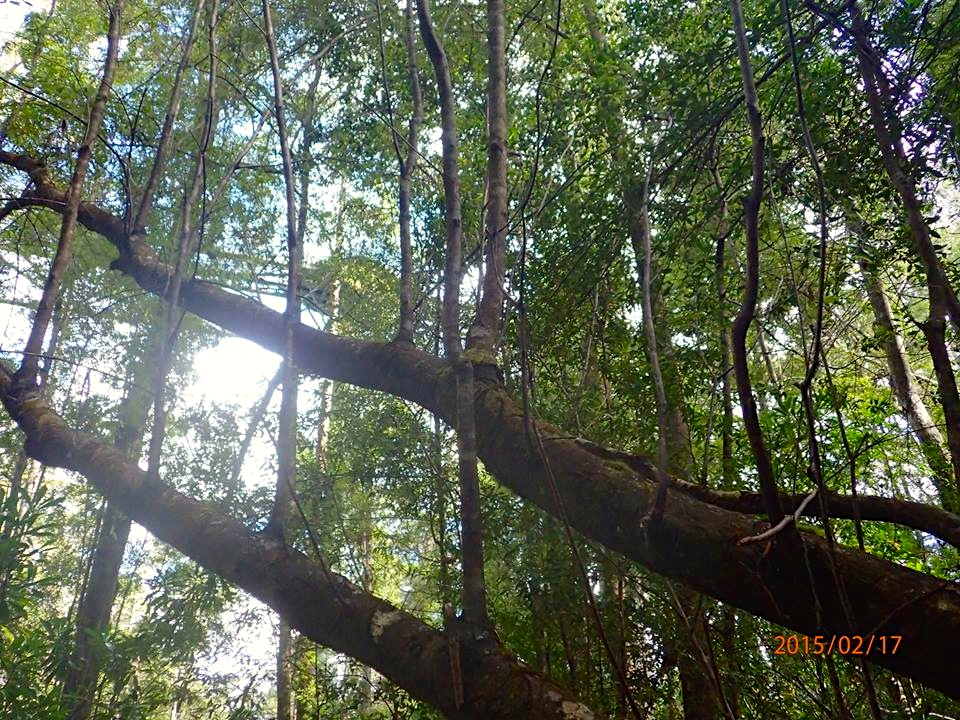
Anodopetalum biglandulosum horizontal primary shoots with secondary vertical shoots.

=== Leaf morphology ===
The leaves are opposite and unifoliolate. The leaves are bright green, narrow elliptical to ovate in shape, (5-15mm wide) and (15-60mm long), end with a blunt point and have coarsely serrated margins.

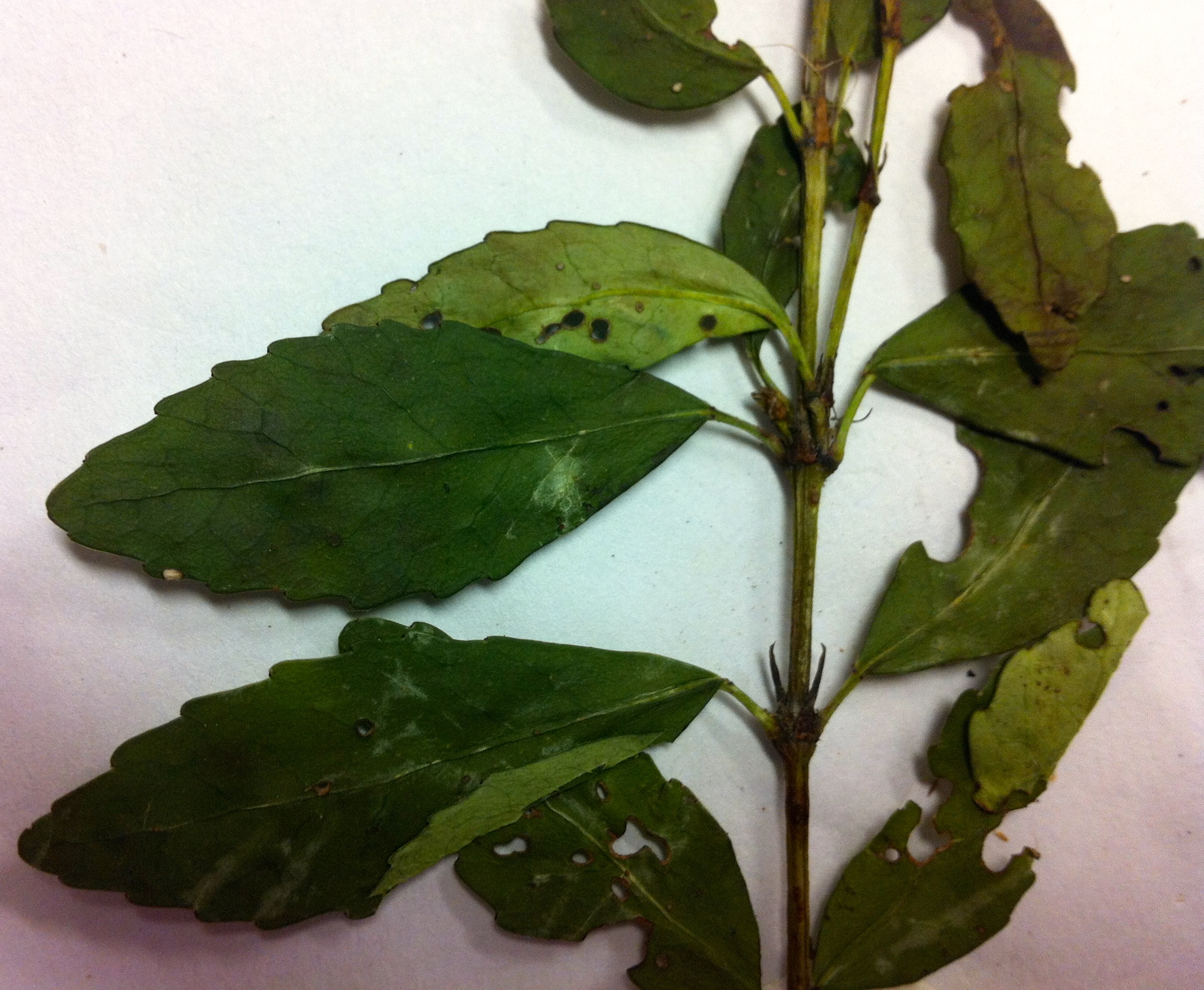
Anodopetalum biglandulosum leaves.

=== Flower and fruit morphology ===
Anodopetalum is from Greek roots an 'not', odous 'tooth' and petalum 'petal', originating from the non-toothed nature of the Anodopetalum biglandulosum petals. The solitary or occasional inflorescence of two to three flowers, grow in the leaf axils and are between 4–8mm long. The four sepals are ovate in shape and are 4–6mm long. The four petals are lanceolate in shape, green-yellow in colour and 2–3 mm long. Flowering occurs in November and December.

Anodopetalum biglandulosum fruit is fleshy, green and 13–14 mm long and 2–6 mm wide with a solitary seed.

== Distribution ==
Anodopetalum biglandulosum is a Tasmanian endemic species that is a common component of Tasmanian cool temperate rainforests. Tasmanian rainforests are classified along a fertility gradient into three major types: callidendrous, thamnic and implicate rainforests. Callidendrous rainforests are tall, park-like forests with few shrubs in the understory, located on high fertility soils. Thamnic rainforests are well-formed trees, medium in height, with a distinct shrub layer on intermediate fertility soils. Implicate rainforests are low, tangled forests with uneven canopies on infertile soils. Anodopetalum biglandulosum is typically an understory species in thamnic rainforests, as well as a canopy species in implicate rainforests. This species is present below 1100m altitude in high rainfall areas (in excess of 1750mm) and on poorly drained acid soils in Western and Southern Tasmania. In these locations, A. biglandulosum forms a tangle of stems producing its characteristic 'horizontal' scrub growth.

== Growth variation ==
Anodopetalum biglandulosum has a flexible growth form. There are four main classifications of growth form: single stemmed and suckering shrub, multi-stemmed coppice, tangled shrub and monopodial tree. Variation in growth form is due to forest type, community structure and the degree of disturbance.

== Response to disturbance ==
Anodopetalum biglandulosum has the ability to regenerate after low intensity fires. After fire disturbance, vegetative regeneration occurs by sprouting from protected buds at the base of stems. Vegetative reproduction after fire disturbances allows A. biglandulosum to return to pre-fire density by reaching sexual maturity and forming a closed canopy. This major form of regeneration is advantageous over seed reproduction, as A. biglandulosum seedlings are intolerant of shade and susceptible to grazing.
