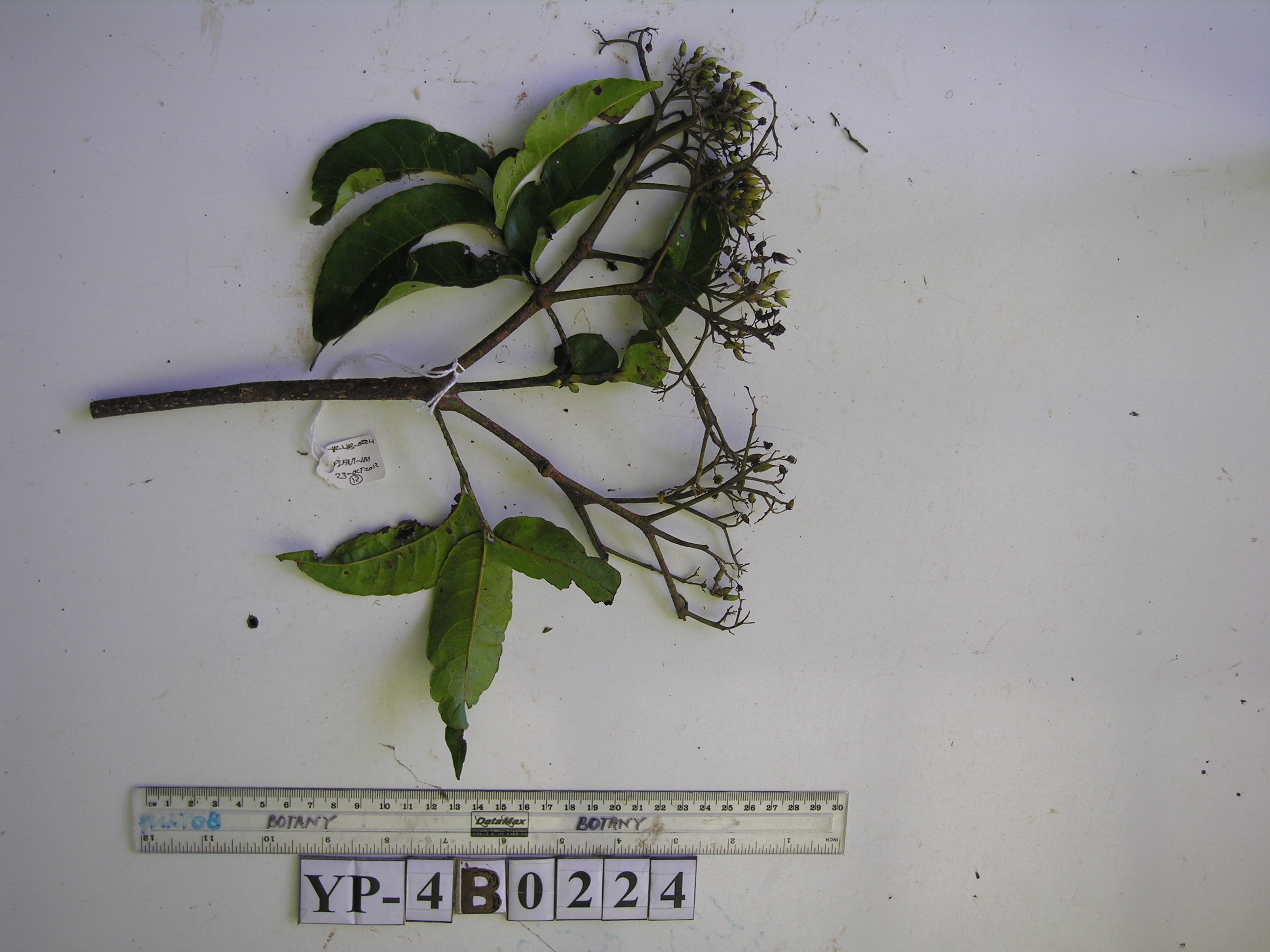

Conservation status
- Least Concern (IUCN 3.1)

Scientific classification
- Kingdom: Plantae
- Clade: Tracheophytes
- Clade: Angiosperms
- Clade: Eudicots
- Clade: Rosids
- Order: Oxalidales
- Family: Cunoniaceae
- Genus: Opocunonia; Schltr.
- Species: O. nymanii

Binomial name
- Opocunonia nymanii (K.Schum.) Schltr.

Synonyms
- Genus: Stollaea Schltr.; Species: Ackama nymanii K.Schum.; Caldcluvia nymanii (K.Schum.) Hoogland; Opocunonia kaniensis Schltr.; Opocunonia papuana Kaneh. & Hatus.; Opocunonia trifoliolata Schltr.; Stollaea papuana Schltr.

= Opocunonia =

Genus of flowering plant

Opocunonia is a monotypic genus of trees in the family Cunoniaceae. Its only species is Opocunonia nymanii, synonym Caldcluvia nymanii. It is native to New Guinea and the Bismarck Archipelago.
