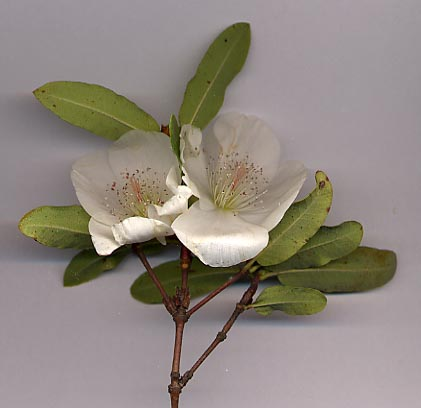
- Eucryphia in flower

Scientific classification
- Kingdom: Plantae
- Clade: Tracheophytes
- Clade: Angiosperms
- Clade: Eudicots
- Clade: Rosids
- Order: Oxalidales
- Family: Cunoniaceae; R.Br.

Genera
- 27 – see text

Synonyms
- Baueraceae Lindl.; Belangeraceae J.Agardh; Callicomaceae J.Agardh; Codiaceae Tiegh., nom. inval.; Davidsoniaceae Bange; Eucryphiaceae Gay; Spiraeanthemaceae Doweld

= Cunoniaceae =

Cunoniaceae Temporal range: Santonian–Recent (Possible Cenomanian representative)

Family of flowering plants

Cunoniaceae is a family of 27 genera and about 335 species of woody plants in the order Oxalidales, mostly found in the tropical and wet temperate regions of the Southern Hemisphere. The greatest diversity of genera are in Australia and Tasmania (15 genera), New Guinea (9 genera), and New Caledonia (7 genera). The family is also present in Central America, South America, the Caribbean, Malesia, the islands of the South Pacific, Madagascar and surrounding islands. The family is absent from mainland Asia except from Peninsular Malaysia, and almost absent from mainland Africa apart from two species from Southern Africa (Cunonia capensis and Platylophus trifoliatus). Several of the genera have remarkable disjunct ranges, found on more than one continent, e.g. Cunonia (Southern Africa and New Caledonia), Eucryphia (Australia and South America) Weinmannia (The Americas and the Mascarenes).

The family includes trees and shrubs; most are evergreen but a few are deciduous. The leaves are opposite or whorled (alternate in Davidsonia), and simple or compound (pinnate or palmate), with entire or toothed margin, and often with conspicuous stipules (interpetiolar or intrapetiolar). The flowers have four or five (rarely three or up to ten) sepals and petals. The fruit is usually a woody capsule or a follicle containing several small seeds.

The family has a rich fossil record in Australia and fossil representatives are known from the Northern Hemisphere. Platydiscus peltatus was found in Upper Cretaceous rocks from Sweden and is likely a member of the Cunoniaceae. An earlier possible fossil member is from the Cenomanian. Tropidogyne, found in Burmese amber, has flowers that strongly resemble the extant Ceratopetalum.

== Taxonomy ==
Plants of the World Online accepts 27 genera as of May 2026. They have been grouped into six tribes as follows:

Tribe Spiraeanthemeae

- Spiraeanthemum A. Gray

Tribe Schizomerieae

- Anodopetalum A. Cunn. ex Endl.
- Ceratopetalum Sm.
- Schizomeria D. Don
- Platylophus D. Don

Tribe Geissoieae

- Geissois Labill.
- Karrabina Rozefelds & H.C. Hopkins
- Lamanonia Vell.
- Pseudoweinmannia Engl.

Tribe Caldcluvieae

- Ackama A. Cunn.
- Caldcluvia D. Don
- Opocunonia Schltr.

Tribe Codieae

- Callicoma Andrews
- Codia J.R. Forst. & G. Forst.
- Pullea Schltr.

Tribe Cunonieae

- Cunonia L.
- Pancheria Brongn. & Gris
- Pterophylla D. Don
- Vesselowskya Pamp.
- Weinmannia L.

Unplaced to tribe

- Acrophyllum Benth.
- Aistopetalum Schltr.
- Bauera Banks ex Andrews
- Davidsonia E. Muell.
- Eucryphia Cav.
- Hooglandia McPherson & Lowry
- Gillbeea F. Muell.
