= Imohori Tōgoro Shrine =

Shinto shrine in Kanazawa, Ishikawa, Japan

Imohori Tōgoro Shrine 芋堀藤五郎神社
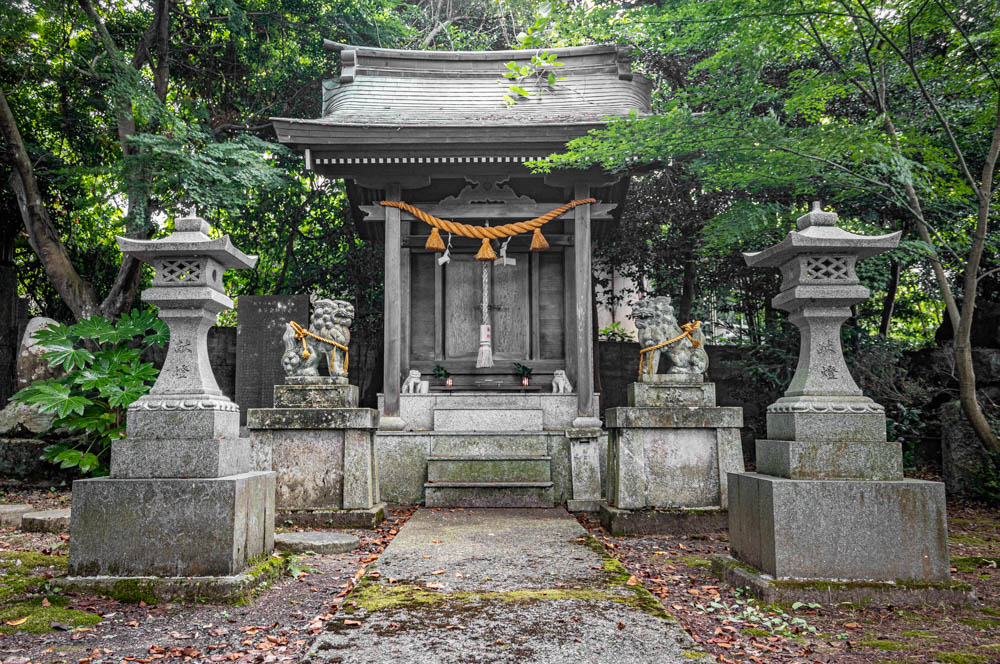
- Imohori Tōgoro Shrine

- Location within Japan

Religion
- Affiliation: Shinto
- Type: Village shrine

Location
- Location: Yamashina-machi, Kanazawa, Ishikawa Prefecture, Japan
- Coordinates: 36°31′32″N 136°39′8″E

Architecture
- Style: One-bay shrine built in the nagare-zukuri style
- Founder: Yamashina Youth Association
- Established: 1931, renovated 1988

Imohori Tōgoro Shrine (芋堀藤五郎神社, imohori Tōgoro-jinja), also known as Tōgoro Shrine (藤五郎神社, Tōgoro-jinja) is a Shinto shrine located in the hillside community of Yamashina-machi, Kanazawa, Ishikawa Prefecture, Japan. It is a one-bay shrine built in the nagare-zukuri style.

The shrine is a featured cultural monument along the city's "Southern Hills Historical Dream Road" walking course.

== Association with the Tōgoro legend ==
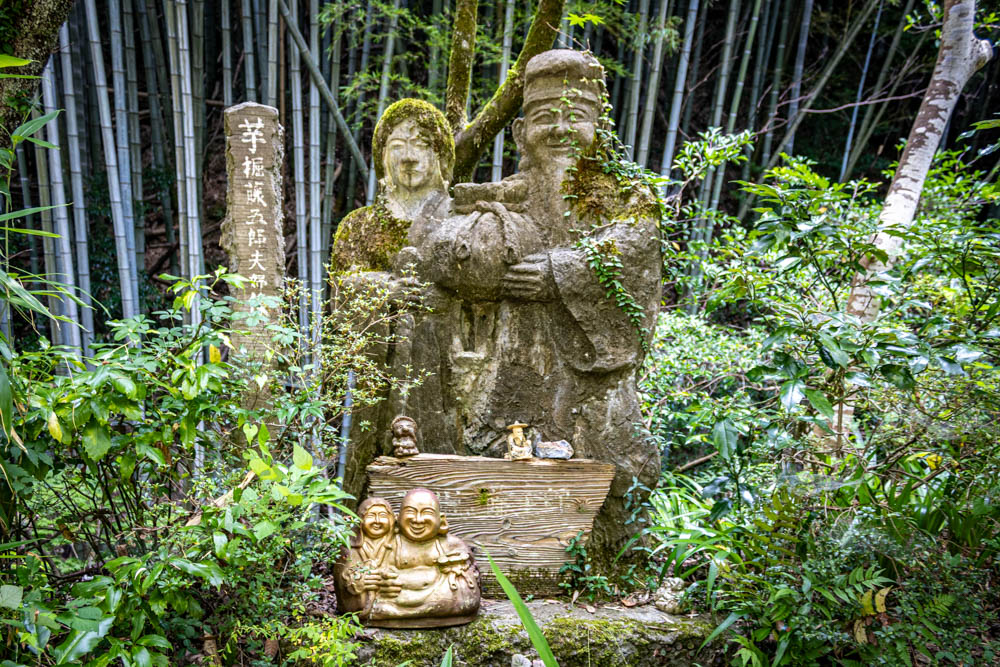
Statue of Tōgoro and his wife, Yamashina-machi

The shrine is notable for its connection with the Kanazawa folk-legend of Tōgoro, a yam-digging (芋堀, imohori) resident of Yamashina (c.716), who found particles of gold when washing yams in a stream near Kanazawa's Kenroku-en park. According to the story, the "kanearai-sawa" (gold-washing stream) was the origin of Kanazawa's name.

== History ==
An inscribed plaque in the shrine grounds, written by the Japan Folklore Society, records that Imohori Tōgoro shrine was built in 1931 by the Yamashina Youth Association, who moved a monument commemorating Tōgoro from the nearby Yamashina Shrine to the new location. In 1988 it was renovated and enlarged, with a new shrine building and komainu guardian statues, tōrō stone lanterns, torii gate and chōzubachi hand-washing basin.
