= Suikinkutsu =

Japanese musical garden ornament

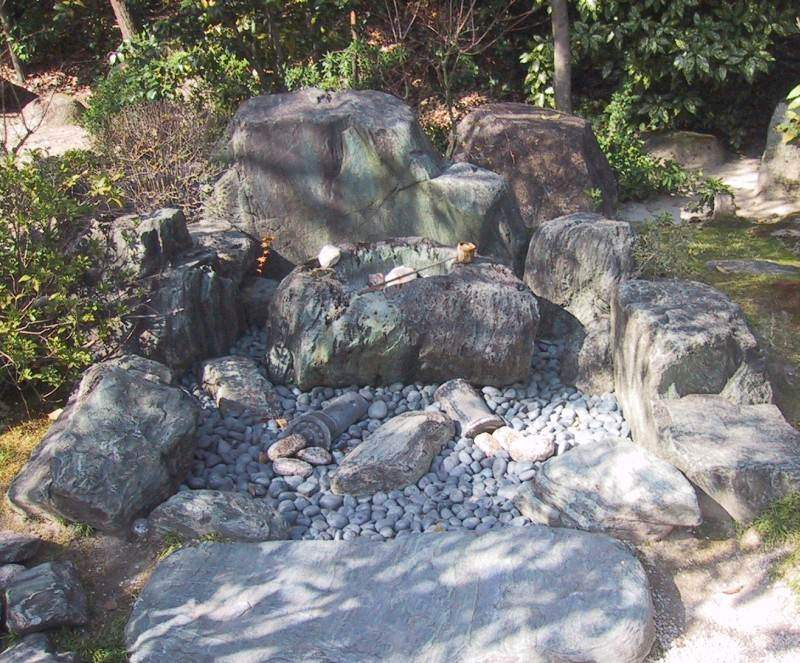
Double suikinkutsu at Iwasaki Castle, Nisshin city, Aichi prefecture

A suikinkutsu (水琴窟; lit. 'water koto cavern') is a type of Japanese garden ornament and music device. It consists of an upside down buried pot with a hole at the top. Water drips through the hole at the top onto a small pool of water inside of the pot, creating a pleasant splashing sound that rings inside of the pot similar to a bell or Japanese zither. It is usually built next to a traditional Japanese stone basin called chōzubachi, part of a tsukubai for washing hands before the Japanese tea ceremony.

Suikinkutsu recording
Recording of the sound of a suikinkutsu

== Traditional construction ==
Constructing a suikinkutsu is more difficult than it looks, because all components have to be finely tuned with each other to ensure a good sound. The most important piece of a suikinkutsu is the jar, the upside down pot buried underground. Initially, jars that were readily available for storage of rice or water were utilized for the construction of a suikinkutsu. Both glazed and unglazed ceramic jars can be used. Recently, metal suikinkutsu have also become commercially available. Unglazed jars are considered best, as the rough surface aids in the building of drops. The height ranges from 30 cm to 1 m, and the diameter from 30 cm to 50 cm. The hole at the top has a diameter of circa 2 cm. Similar to a bell, the jar of a good suikinkutsu will ring when struck. A jar producing a good sound will create a good sounding suikinkutsu. Similarly, a cracked jar, like a cracked bell, will not produce a good sound.

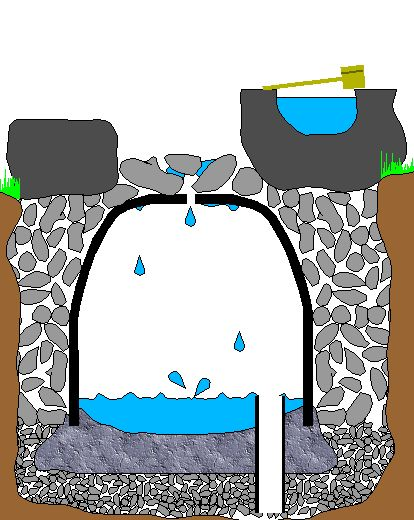
Cross section of a suikinkutsu

The suikinkutsu usually rests on a bed of gravel underground. The base underneath the jar is sometimes mortared to keep the water in, and sometimes consists only of soil as for example clay. The drainage pipe makes sure that the water level in the suikinkutsu does not rise too high. Sometimes ceramic tiles are also used on the sides of the jar. Fist size stones are on top of the suikinkutsu to cover the jar completely. Traditionally suikinkutsu are always found near a hand wash basin chōzubachi used for the Japanese tea ceremony, and the suikinkutsu is buried between the basin and the stepping stone next to the basin. The designs and materials used for a suikinkutsu also vary widely, often depending on the local region.

Usually, only a single jar is buried underneath a chōzubachi Japanese stone basin. However, in some rare cases there may also be two suikinkutsu adjacent to each other in front of the same chōzubachi. Such a double installation can be found for example in front of the Iwasaki Castle, Nisshin city, Aichi Prefecture, in the campus of the Takasaki Art Center College, Takasaki, Gunma prefecture, or in Kyoto University, Kyoto. However, having two openings about 50 cm apart means that it is difficult to cover the ergonomic best spot for washing hands with both openings. Thus, the creation of the sound is usually done intentionally by splashing water over the two designated spots, rather than accidentally by washing hands. Suikinkutsu with more than two jars may also be possible, such as for example three jars at the Shirotori garden in Nagoya.

== Modern variations ==
There are a number of modern variations form the traditional suikinkutsu. the list below shows some of the possibilities for modern suikinkutsu.

- Modern suikinkutsu are not always located next to a chōzubachi as traditionally required.
- Suikinkutsu can also be built with a continuous stream of water for a continuous suitekion sound instead of the ryūsuion and suitekion alteration (see below).
- Metal suikinkutsu are also available nowadays.
- Some above ground devices similar to a suikinkutsu have also been installed, for example as part of sculptures.
- Suikinkutsu are also installed indoors
- Commercial venues (restaurants, shops, and also offices) may have the sound of the indoor or outdoor suikinkutsu amplified electronically and played through speakers.
- An additional pipe may also be installed to convey the sound from the cavity in the suikinkutsu to another location, e.g. indoors.

== History ==
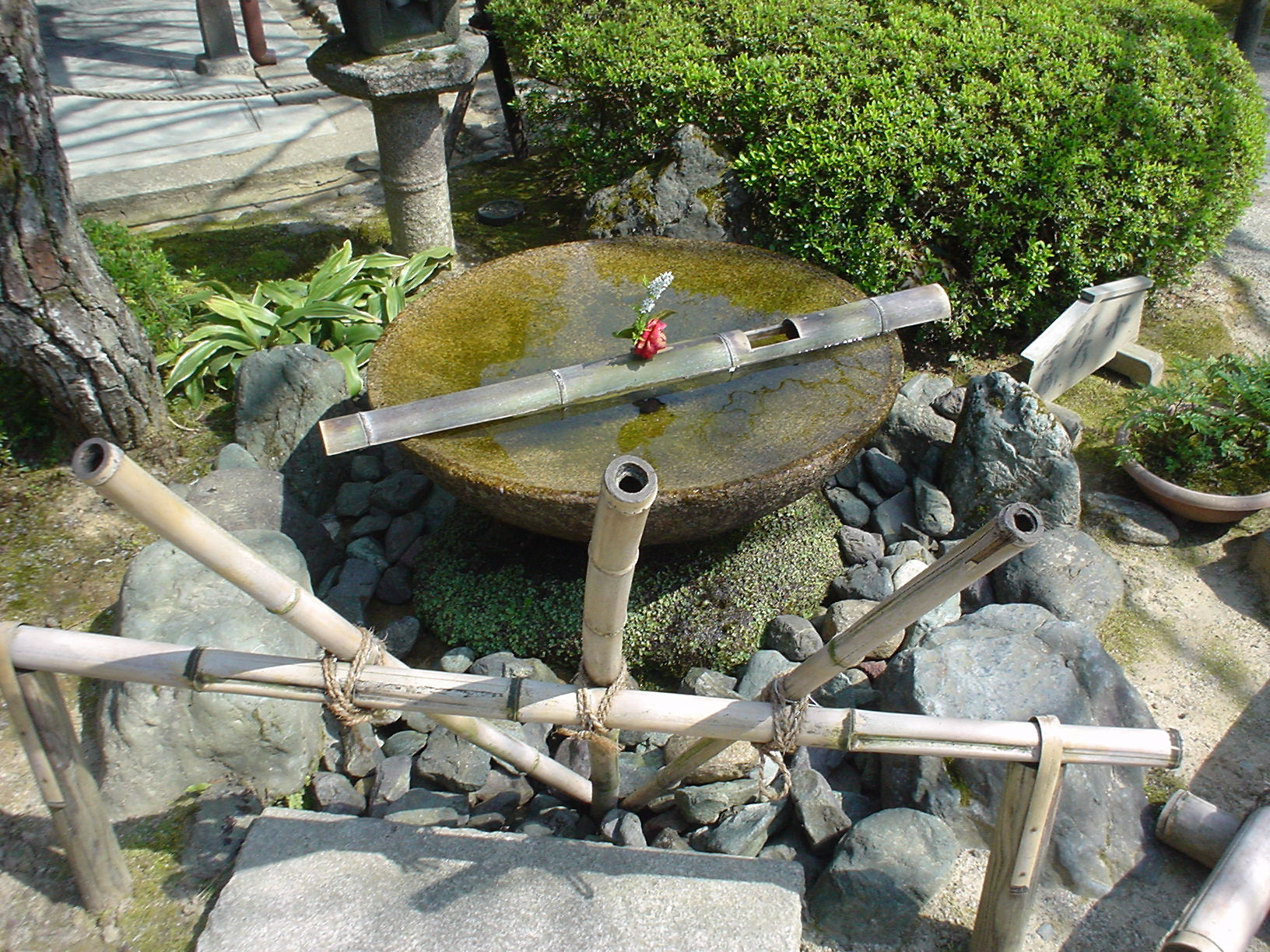
Suikinkutsu at Enkō-ji Temple (円光寺), Kyoto

Historically, suikinkutsu were known as tōsuimon (洞水門; literally "water gate"), but they were rarely used in Japanese gardens. It is believed that initially a vessel was buried upside down next to the washing basin in Japanese gardens to act as a drainage system. This sometimes produced pleasant sounds, and gardeners subsequently sought to improve the sound quality of the device. Their rise in popularity and the name suikinkutsu originated from the middle of the Edo period (1603–1867), around the same time the stone basin chōzubachi was developed. The famous tea ceremony teacher Kobori Enshu of that time had a suikinkutsu in his garden, and he is subsequently often credited as the inventor of suikinkutsu. At the end of the Edo period, the creation of suikinkutsu became less frequent, but became popular again during the Meiji Era (1867–1912).

At the beginning of the 20th century, i.e. the early Shōwa period, both the name suikinkutsu and the device were all but forgotten, and a report of Professor Katsuzo Hirayama at the Tokyo University of Agriculture from 1959 could find only two suikinkutsu in Japan, both of them inoperable and filled with earth. However, a journalist from the Asahi Shimbun wrote about suikinkutsu in 1982, and requested information from the public about the topic. This led to a re-discovery of many suikinkutsu, and a number of articles about suikinkutsu in the Asahi Shimbun. Shortly thereafter, in 1985, NHK aired a program about suikinkutsu on Japanese television, and sparked a suikinkutsu revival, with many new suikinkutsu installed.

== Acoustics ==
The sound of a suikinkutsu has its own name in Japanese, called suikin'on. The sounds can furthermore be divided in two sub groups, ryūsuion and suitekion. The ryūsuion is the sound of the first few water drops at the beginning of washing hands. The suitekion describes both the sound of a lot of water falling at the same time during washing hands and the slower drops at the end of the washing.

A superior suikinkutsu has water drops originating from different spots on the surface of the jar. Unglazed jars hold moisture better, and therefore have drops originate from more spots on the surface. The impact of the water on the surface creates a sound, that is amplified by the design of the jar. Some suikinkutsu do provide a bamboo tube nearby, which can amplify the sounds if one end is put on the ground near the top of the suikinkutsu and the other end is placed on the ear.

It is said that every suikinkutsu sounds different.

== Philosophy ==
An important part of the idea behind the suikinkutsu is that the device is hidden from view. Instead, the visitor washes his/her hands, and suddenly hears the pleasant sounds coming from underground. The act of washing the hands can also be considered as playing the suikinkutsu, and the sounds emerge shortly after the washing. This clear sound of water drops is considered relaxing and soothing, and also described as beautiful and peaceful.

== See also ==
- Shishi-odoshi
- Japanese garden
