= Chōzuya =

Shinto water ablution pavilion

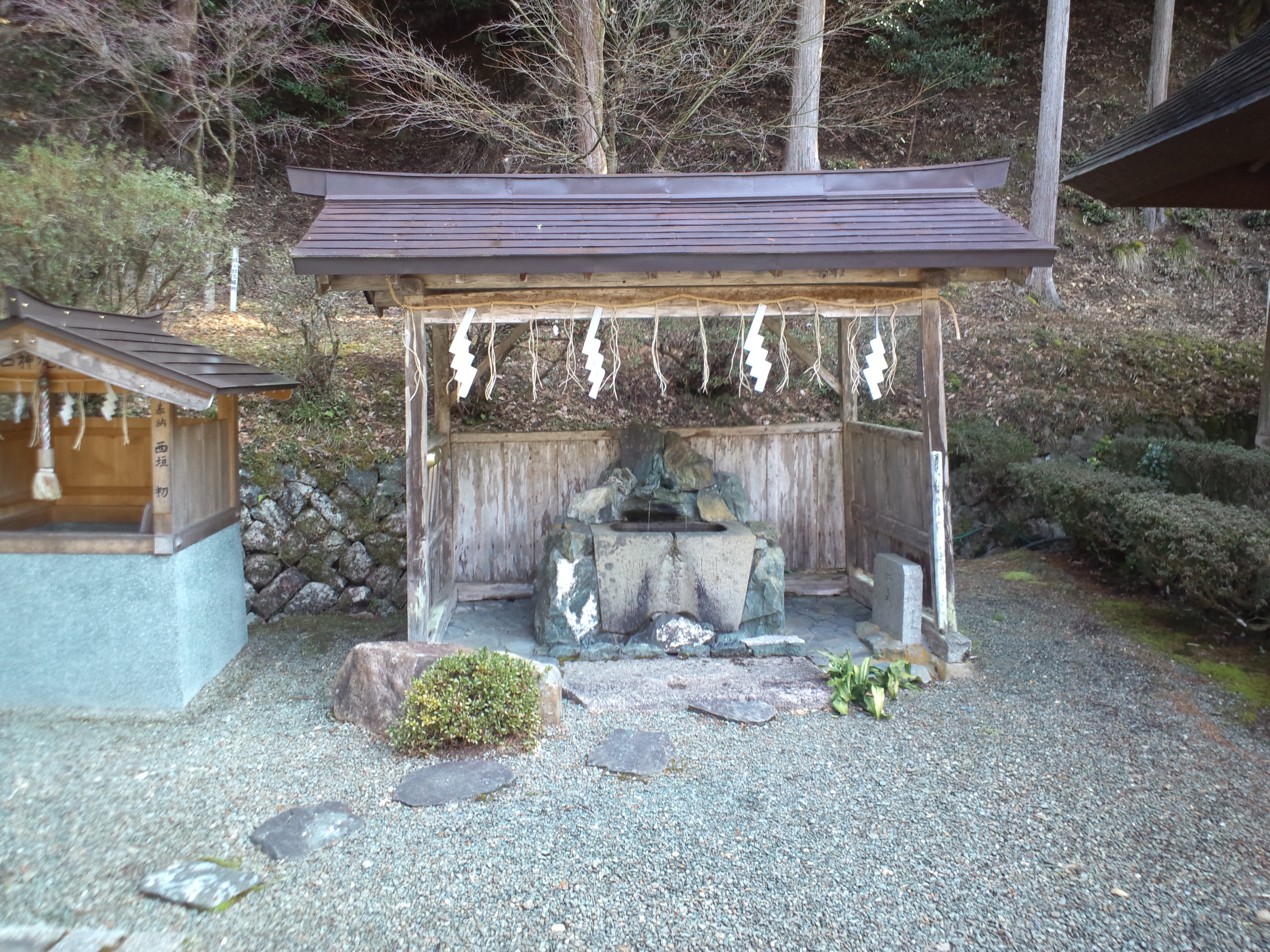
Chōzu-ya at rural Make-jinja

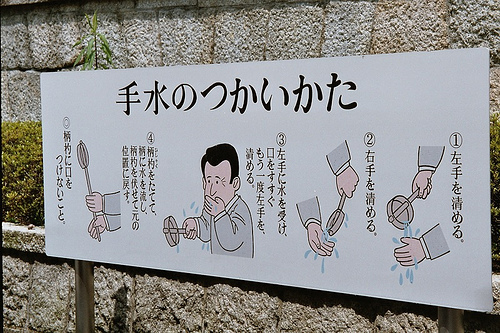
A sign (read right-to-left) explains how to do chōzu.

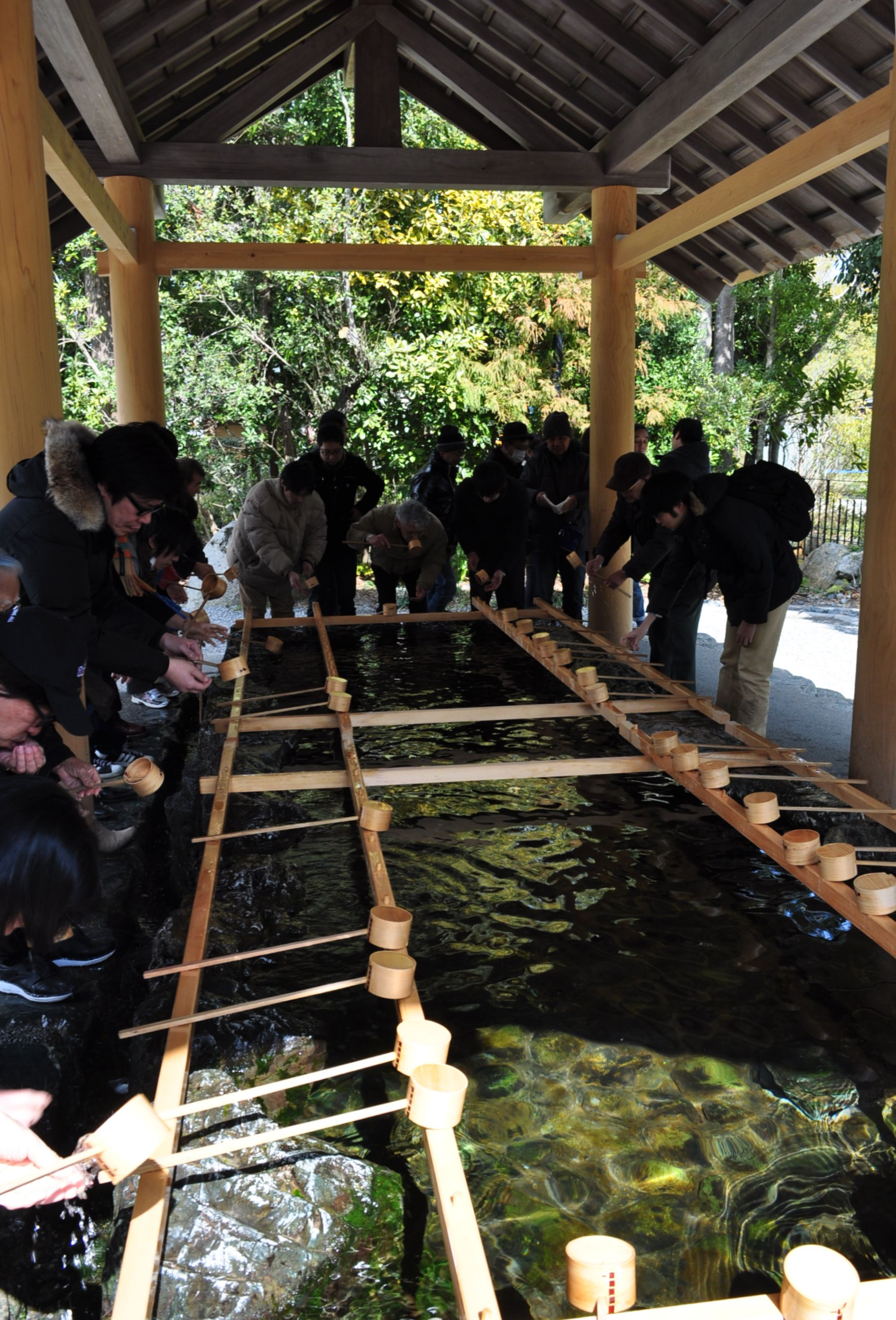
Inside a pavilion, performing chōzu

Chōzu-ya or temizu-ya (手水舎) is a Shinto water ablution pavilion for a ceremonial purification rite known as temizu or chōzu (手水; lit. 'hand-water'). The pavilion contains a large water-filled basin called a chōzubachi (手水鉢; lit. 'hand water basin').

At shrines, these chōzubachi are used by a worshipper to wash their left hand, right hand, mouth and finally the handle of the water ladle to purify themselves before approaching the main Shinto shrine or shaden (社殿). This symbolic purification is normal before worship and all manned shrines have this facility, as well as many Buddhist temples and some new religious houses of worship. The temizu-ya is usually an open area where clear water fills one or various stone basins. Dippers (hishaku (杓)) are usually available to worshippers. In the 1990s, water for temizu at shrines was sometimes from domestic wells, and sometimes from the municipal supply.

Water has played a large role in Japanese spirituality since pre-historic times, most notably in the form of misogi done at a spring, stream or seashore and based in the legend of the purification of Izanagi, and the similar Buddhist practice of kori among others. Temizu delevoped as an abbreviation of Misogi, although misogi was considered the ideal at least in the 1960s, and worshippers at the Inner Shrine at Ise still use this traditional way of ablution.

As a further form of preparation before certain rites, officiating priests (shinshoku) and participants may observe a separate purification called kiyochōzu, performed not at the ordinary chōzuya but with water provided specifically for the occasion. The COVID-19 pandemic caused many shrines to remove the dippers and instructions to wash the mouth, with water flow to the chōzu basins often stopped and replaced with dipper-free dripping water systems or hand sanitizer in order to comply with public health norms and prevent infections.

Starting at the Yōkoku-ji in 2017 hanachōzu (花手水, hanachōzu/hanatemizu) which is the practice of floating flowers in the chōzu basin has become popular across temples in Japan. The practice and became a social media phenomenon beginning in 2018 with many shrines, both Shinto and Buddhist, following suite hoping to combat declining visitor numbers. Hanachōzu received further attention in 2020 with it being a popularized as a solution to pandemic challenges in the media, such as a way to use chōzu basins during pandemic restrictions, an good use for unsold flowers from florists, and an alternative to hanami, with there being 200 to 300 temples that had hanachōzu in 2022.

== See also ==
- Chōzubachi
- Glossary of Shinto
- Harae, a term for all Shinto purification rituals, including temizu
  - Misogi, a Shinto ritual of full-body purification
- Ritual purification
- Tsukubai, a washbasin for visitors in Japanese Buddhist temples or roji
- Ablution in Christianity
- Ghusl
- Wudu
