= Ryōan-ji =

Zen temple in Kyoto, Japan

- 龍安寺
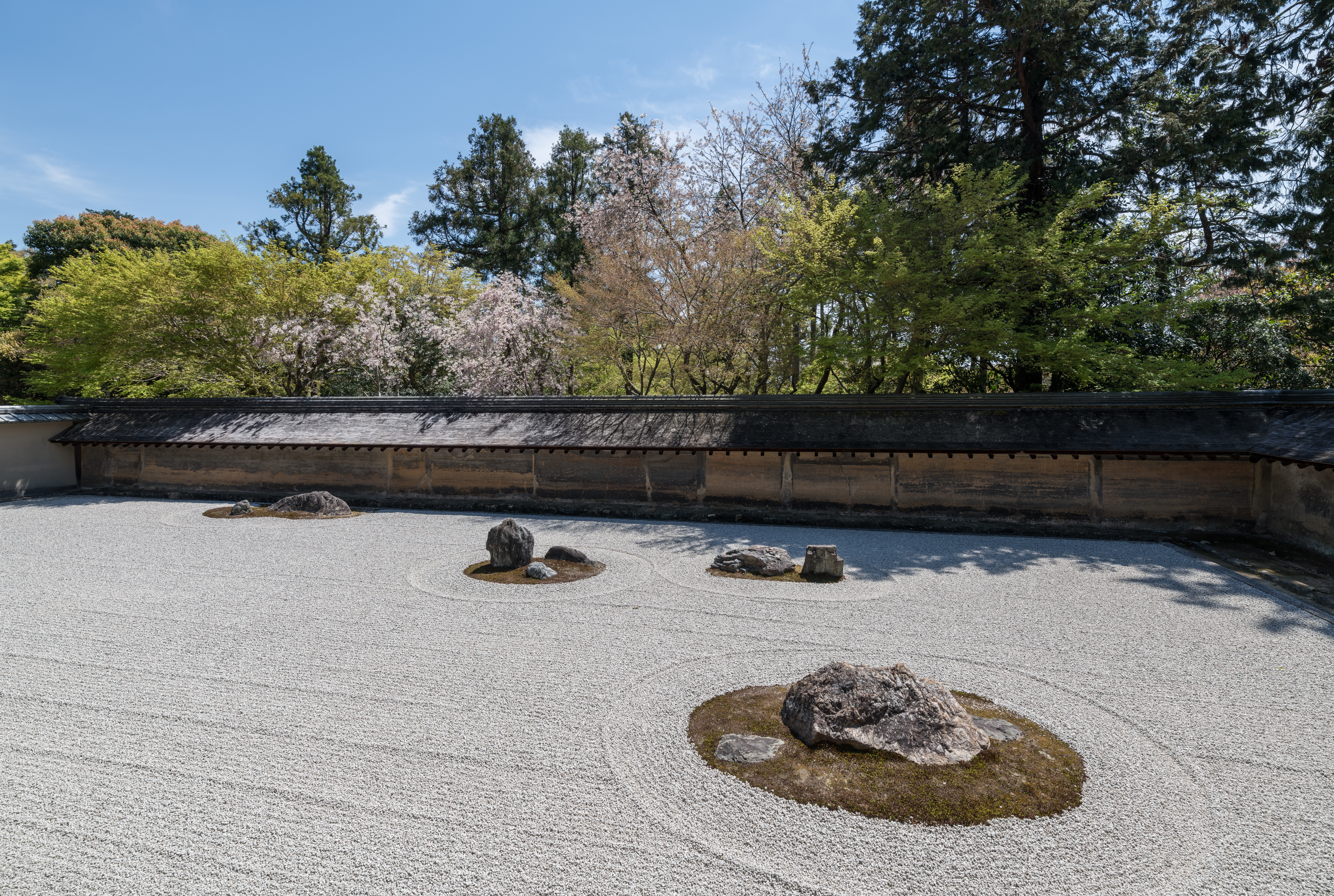
- The kare-sansui (dry landscape) zen garden at Ryōan-ji

- Location in Kyoto

Religion
- Affiliation: Zen, Rinzai sect, Myōshin-ji school
- Deity: Shaka Nyorai (Śākyamuni)

Location
- Location: 13 Ryoanji Goryonoshita-chō, Ukyō-ku, Kyoto, Kyoto Prefecture
- Country: Japan
- Coordinates: 35°02′04″N 135°43′06″E

Architecture
- Founder: Hosokawa Katsumoto
- Completed: 1450

Website
- www.ryoanji.jp

Ryōan-ji (Shinjitai: 竜安寺, Kyūjitai: 龍安寺, The Temple of the Dragon at Peace) is a Zen temple located in northwest Kyoto, Japan. It belongs to the Myōshin-ji school of the Rinzai branch of Zen Buddhism. The Ryōan-ji garden is considered one of the finest surviving examples of kare-sansui ("dry landscape"), a refined type of Japanese Zen temple garden design generally featuring distinctive larger rock formations arranged amidst a sweep of smooth pebbles (small, carefully selected polished river rocks) raked into linear patterns that facilitate meditation. The temple and its gardens are listed as one of the Historic Monuments of Ancient Kyoto, and as a UNESCO World Heritage Site.

== History ==
The site of the temple was an estate of the Fujiwara clan in the 11th century. The first temple, the Daiju-in, and the still existing large pond were built in that century by Fujiwara Saneyoshi. In 1450, Hosokawa Katsumoto, another powerful warlord, acquired the land where the temple stood. He built his residence there, and founded a Zen temple, Ryōan-ji. During the Ōnin War between the clans, the temple was destroyed. Hosokawa Katsumoto died in 1473, and in 1488 his son, Hosokawa Masamoto, rebuilt the temple.

The temple served as a mausoleum for several emperors. Their tombs are grouped together in what are today known as the "Seven Imperial Tombs" at Ryōan-ji. The burial places of these emperors—Uda, Kazan, Ichijō, Go-Suzaku, Go-Reizei, Go-Sanjō, and Horikawa—would have been comparatively humble in the period after their deaths. These tombs reached their present state as a result of the 19th century restoration of imperial sepulchers (misasagi) which were ordered by Emperor Meiji.

There is controversy over who built the garden and when. Most sources date it to the second half of the 15th century. According to some sources, it was built by Hosokawa Katsumoto, the creator of the first temple of Ryōan-ji, between 1450 and 1473. Other sources say it was built by his son, Hosokawa Masamoto, in or around 1488. Some say that the garden was built by the famous landscape painter and monk, Sōami (died 1525), but this is disputed by other authors. Some sources say the garden was built in the first half of the 16th century, others reckon later, during the Edo period, between 1618 and 1680. There is also controversy over whether the garden was built by monks, or by professional gardeners, called kawaramono, or a combination of the two. One stone in the garden has the name of two kawaramono carved into it, Hirokojirō and Kotarō.

The conclusive history, though, based on documentary sources, is as follows: Hosokawa Katsumoto (1430–1473), deputy to the shōgun, founded in 1450 the Ryōan-ji temple, but the complex was burnt down during the Ōnin War. His son Masamoto rebuilt the temple at the very end of the same century. It is not clear whether any garden was constructed at that time facing the main hall. First descriptions of a garden, clearly describing one in front of the main hall, date from 1680–1682. It is described as a composition of nine big stones laid out to represent Tiger Cubs Crossing the Water. As the garden has fifteen stones at present, it was clearly different from the garden that we see today. A great fire destroyed the buildings in 1779, and rubble of the burnt buildings was dumped in the garden. Garden writer and specialist Akisato Rito (died c. 1830) redid the garden completely on top of the rubble at the end of the eighteenth century and published a picture of his garden in his Celebrated Gardens and Sights of Kyoto (Miyako rinsen meisho zue) of 1799, showing the garden as it looks today. One big stone at the back was buried partly; it has two first names carved in it, probably names of untouchable stone workers, so called kawaramono. There is no evidence of Zen monks having worked on the garden, apart from the raking of the sand.

== Zen garden ==
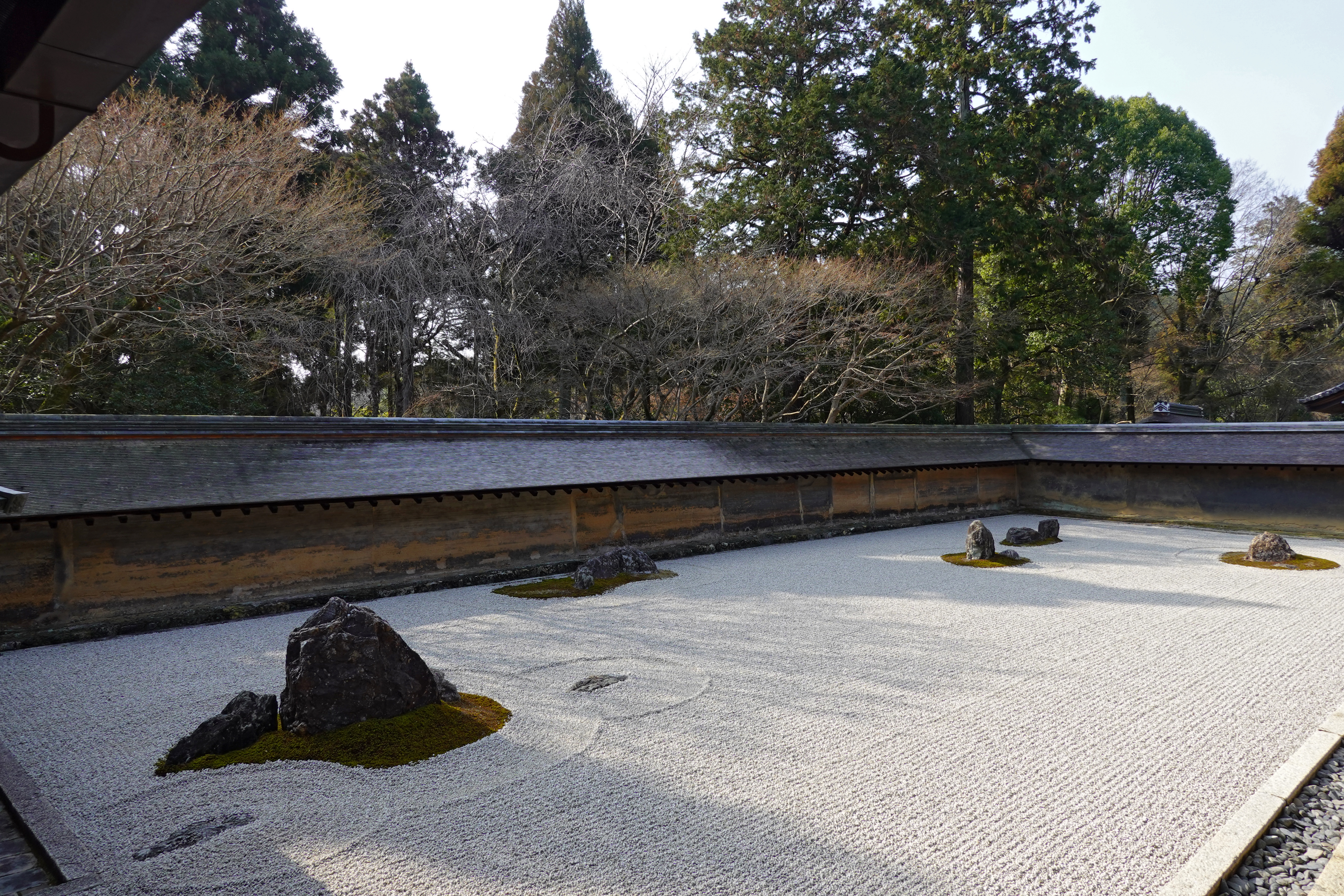
Ryōan-ji dry garden. The clay wall, which is stained by age with subtle brown and orange tones, reflects "sabi" and the rock garden "wabi", together reflecting the Japanese worldview or aesthetic of "wabi-sabi".

The temple's name is synonymous with the temple's famous Zen garden, the karesansui (dry landscape) rock garden, thought to have been built in the late 15th century.

The garden is a rectangle of 248 square meters (2,670 square feet), twenty-five meters by ten meters. Placed within it are fifteen stones of different sizes, carefully composed in five groups; one group of five stones, two groups of three, and two groups of two stones. The stones are surrounded by white gravel, which is carefully raked each day by the monks. The only vegetation in the garden is some moss around the stones.

The dry garden is composed of fifteen stones. From the viewing veranda it is not possible to observe all fifteen from one perspective, with at least one stone remaining hidden from view.

The garden is meant to be viewed from a seated position on the veranda of the hōjō, the residence of the abbot of the monastery. The stones are placed so that the entire composition cannot be seen at once from the veranda.

The wall behind the garden is an important element of the garden. It is made of clay, which has been stained by age with subtle brown and orange tones. In 1977, the tile roof of the wall was restored with tree bark to its original appearance. When the garden was rebuilt in 1799, it came up higher than before and a view over the wall to the mountain scenery behind came about. At present this view is blocked by trees.

The garden had particular significance for the composer John Cage, who composed a series of works and made visual art works based on it.

=== Meaning of the garden ===
Like any work of art, the artistic garden of Ryōan-ji is also open to interpretation or research into possible meanings. Many different theories have been put forward inside and outside Japan about what the garden is supposed to represent, from islands in a stream, a tiger family crossing a river, mountain peaks, to theories about secrets of geometry or the rules of equilibrium of odd numbers. Garden historian Gunter Nitschke wrote: "The garden at Ryōan-ji does not symbolize anything, or more precisely, to avoid any misunderstanding, the garden of Ryōan-ji does not symbolize, nor does it have the value of reproducing a natural beauty that one can find in the real or mythical world. I consider it to be an abstract composition of 'natural' objects in space, a composition whose function is to incite meditation."

=== Scientific analysis of the garden ===
In an article published by the science journal Nature, Gert van Tonder and Michael Lyons analyze the rock garden by generating a model of shape analysis (medial axis) in early visual processing.

Using this model, they show that the empty space of the garden is implicitly structured, and is aligned with the temple's architecture. According to the researchers, one critical axis of symmetry passes close to the centre of the main hall, which is the traditionally preferred viewing point. In essence, viewing the placement of the stones from a sightline along this point brings a shape from nature (a dichotomously branched tree with a mean branch length decreasing monotonically from the trunk to the tertiary level) in relief.

The researchers propose that the implicit structure of the garden is designed to appeal to the viewer's unconscious visual sensitivity to axial-symmetry skeletons of stimulus shapes. In support of their findings, they found that imposing a random perturbation of the locations of individual rock features destroyed the special characteristics.

Centuries after its creation, the influences of the dry elements at Ryōan-ji continue to be reflected and re-examined in garden design—for example, in the Japangarten at the Kunstmuseum Wolfsburg in Germany.

=== Other gardens ===
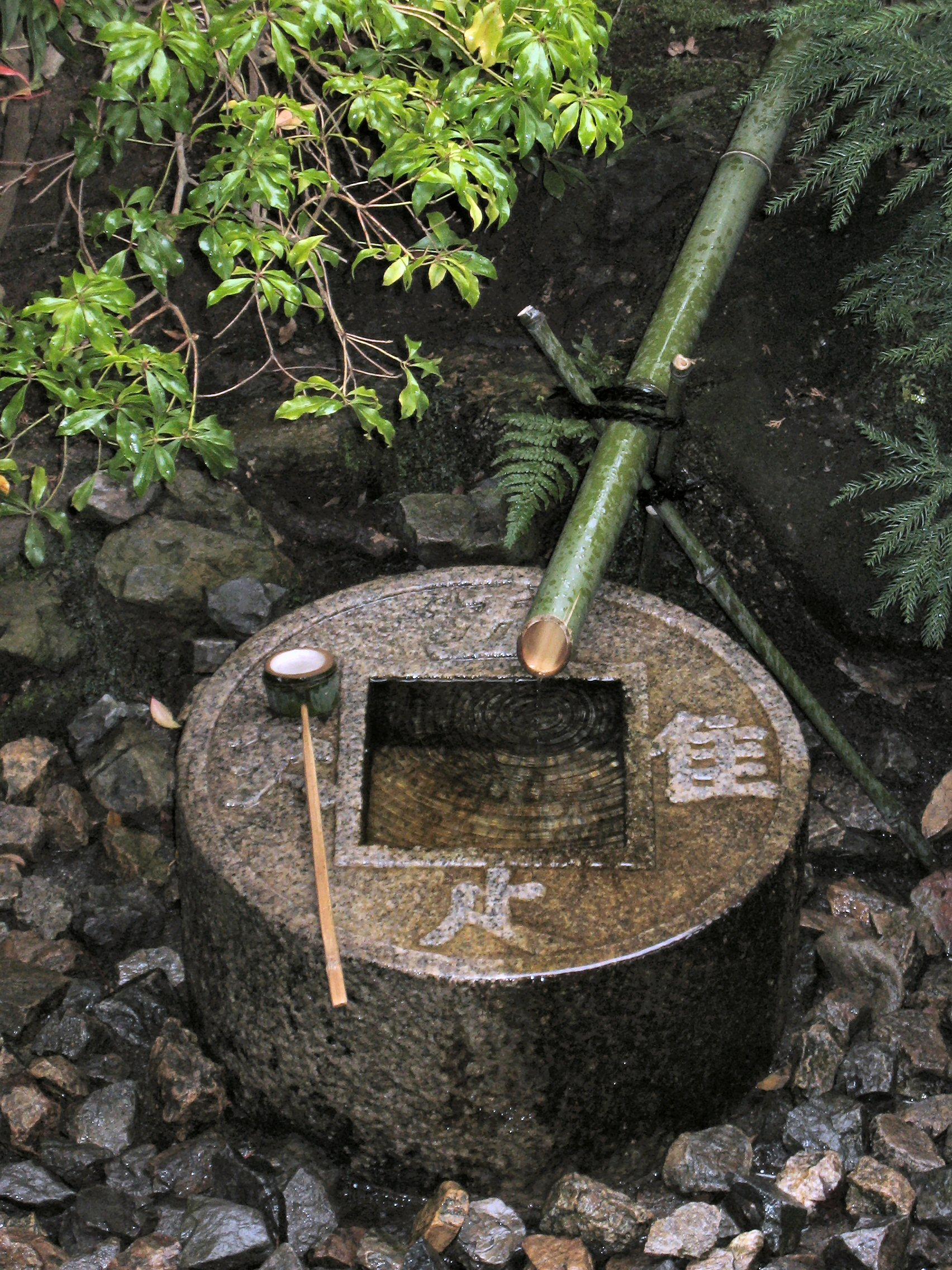
Ryōan-ji's tsukubai, the basin provided for ritual washing of the hands and mouth

While the rock garden is the best-known garden of Ryōan-ji, the temple also has a water garden; the Kyoyochi Pond, built in the 12th century as part of the Fujiwara estate. Cherry trees have recently been planted northwest of the pond.

Ryōan-ji also has a teahouse and tea garden, dating to the 17th century. Near the teahouse is a famous stone water basin, with water continually flowing for ritual purification. This is the Ryōan-ji tsukubai, which translates as "crouch"; because of the low height of the basin, the user must bend over to use it, in a sign of reverence and humility. The kanji written on the surface of the stone basin, 五, 隹, 止, 矢, are without significance when read alone. Though the water basin's frame is circular, the opening in the circular face is itself a square (口). If each of the four kanji is read in combination with 口 (the square-shaped radical is pronounced kuchi, meaning "mouth" or "aperture"), which the square opening is meant to represent, then the characters become 吾, 唯, 足, 知. This is read as "ware, tada taru (wo) shiru", which translates literally as "I only sufficiency know" (吾 = ware = I, 唯 = tada = merely, only, 足 = taru = be sufficient, suffice, be enough, be worth, deserve, 知 = shiru = know) or, more poetically, as "I know only satisfaction". Intended to reinforce Buddhist teachings regarding humility and the abundance within one's soul, the meaning is simple and clear: "one already has all one needs". Meanwhile, the positioning of the tsukubai, lower than the veranda on which one stands to view it, compels one to bow respectfully (while listening to the endless trickle of replenishing water from the bamboo pipe) to fully appreciate its deeper philosophical significance. The tsukubai also embodies a subtle form of Zen teaching using ironic juxtaposition: while the shape mimics an ancient Chinese coin, the sentiment is the opposite of materialism. Thus, over many centuries, the tsukubai has also served as a humorous visual koan for countless monks residing at the temple, gently reminding them daily of their vow of poverty. Notwithstanding the exquisite kare sansui rock garden on the opposite side of the building, the less-photographed Ryōan-ji tea garden is another cultural treasure of the temple.

== Images ==
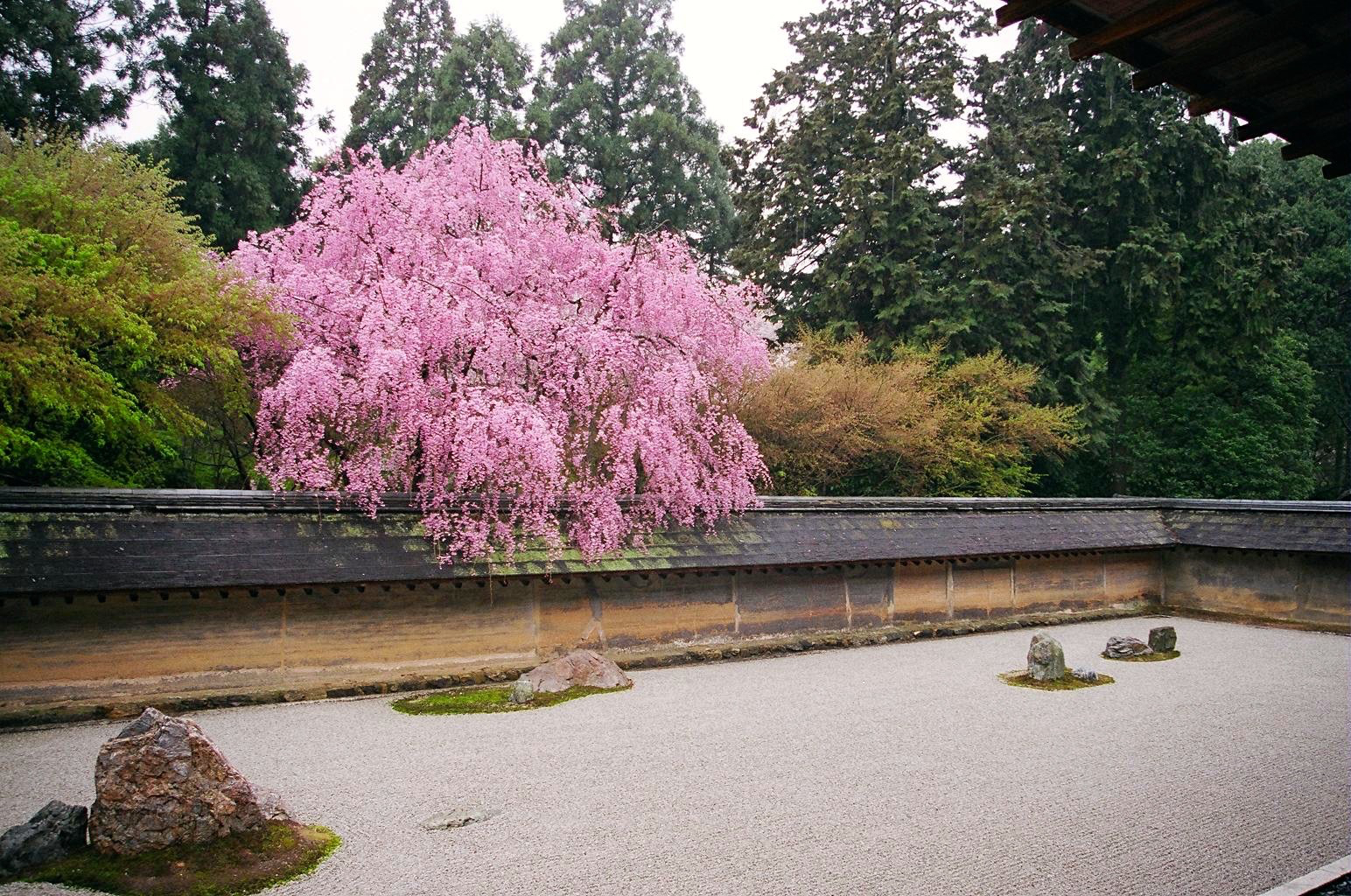
Cherry blossom at the rock garden of Ryōan-ji Temple in Kyoto, Japan

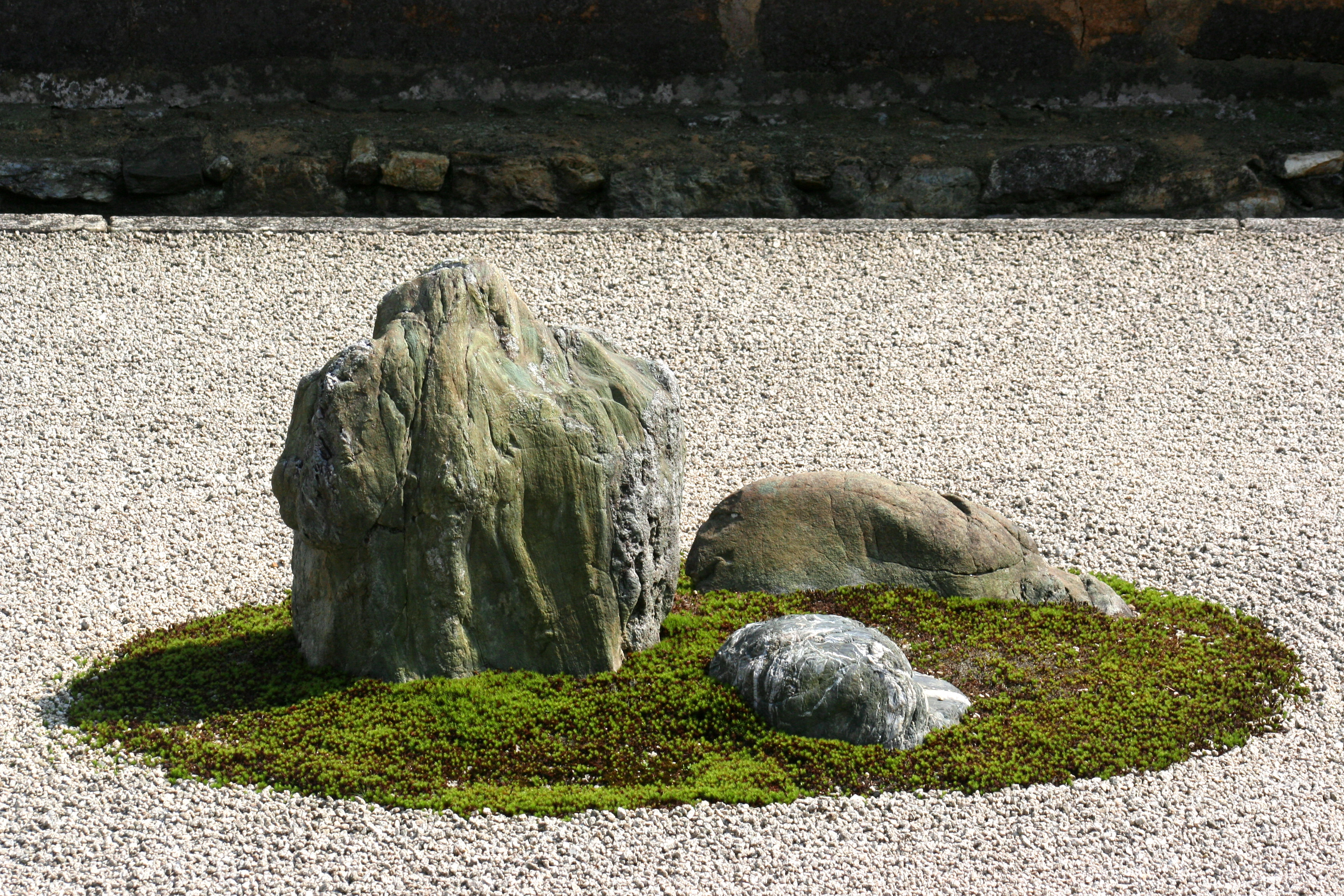
Close up of the zen garden

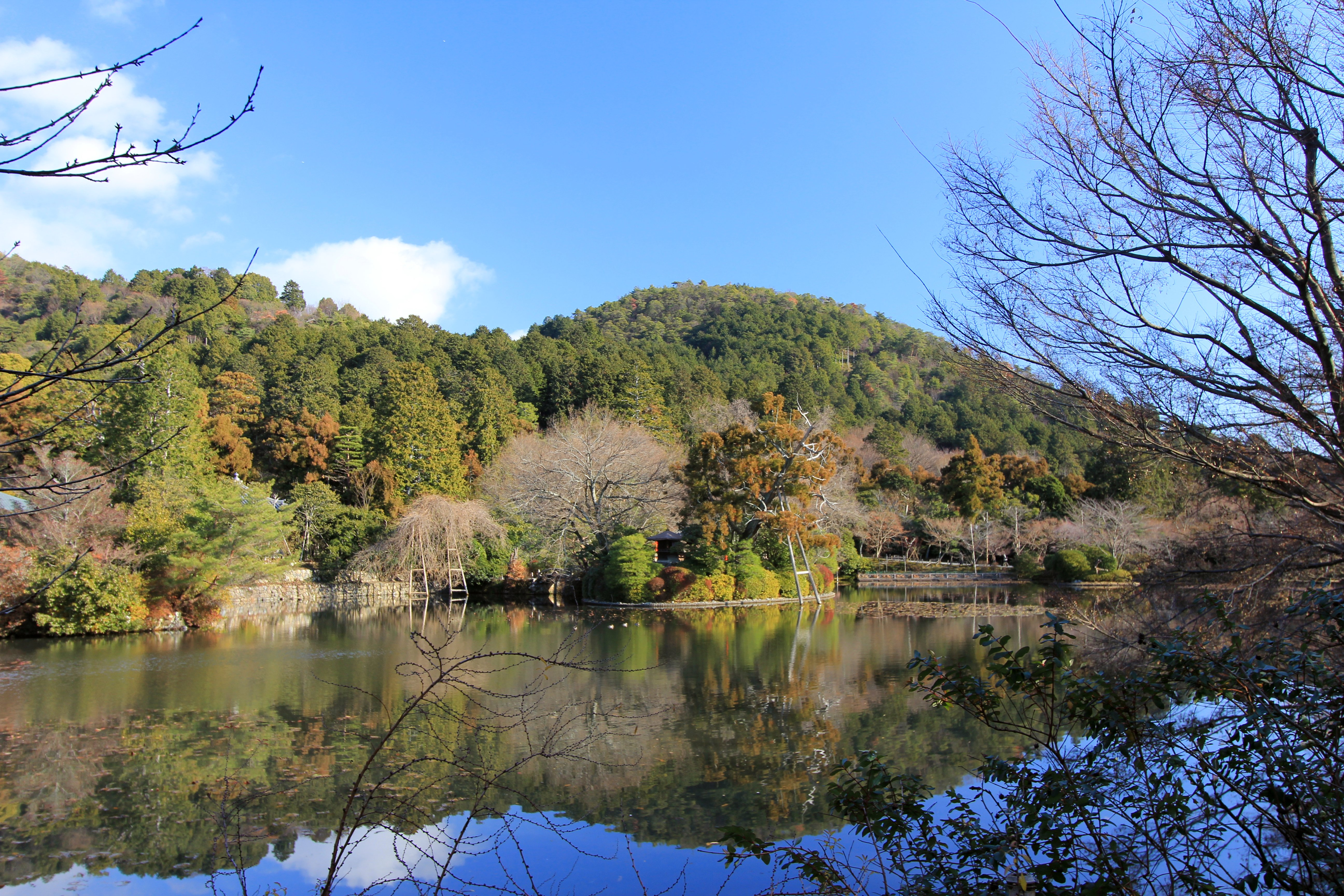
Grounds

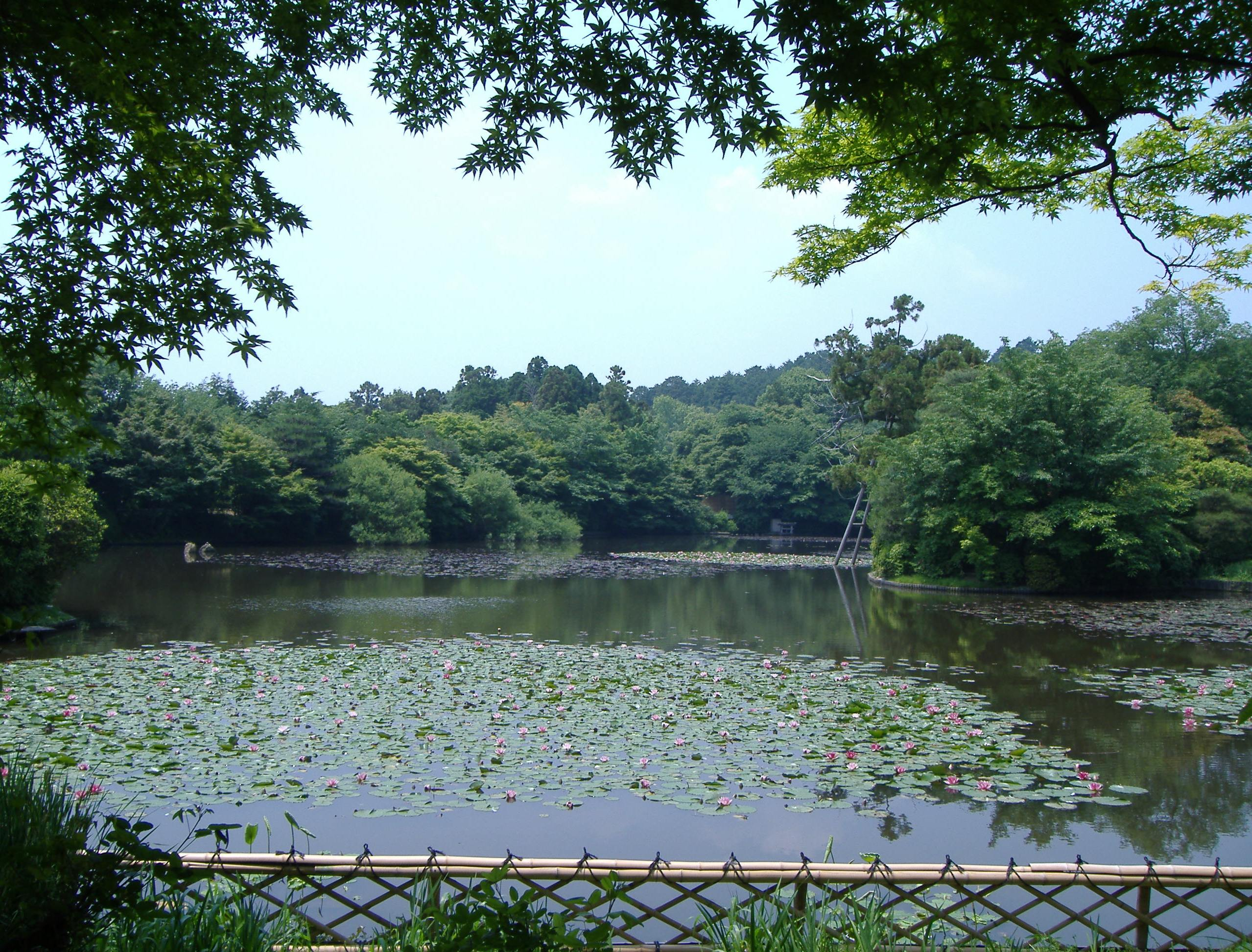
Kyoyochi Pond, created in the 12th century as a water garden

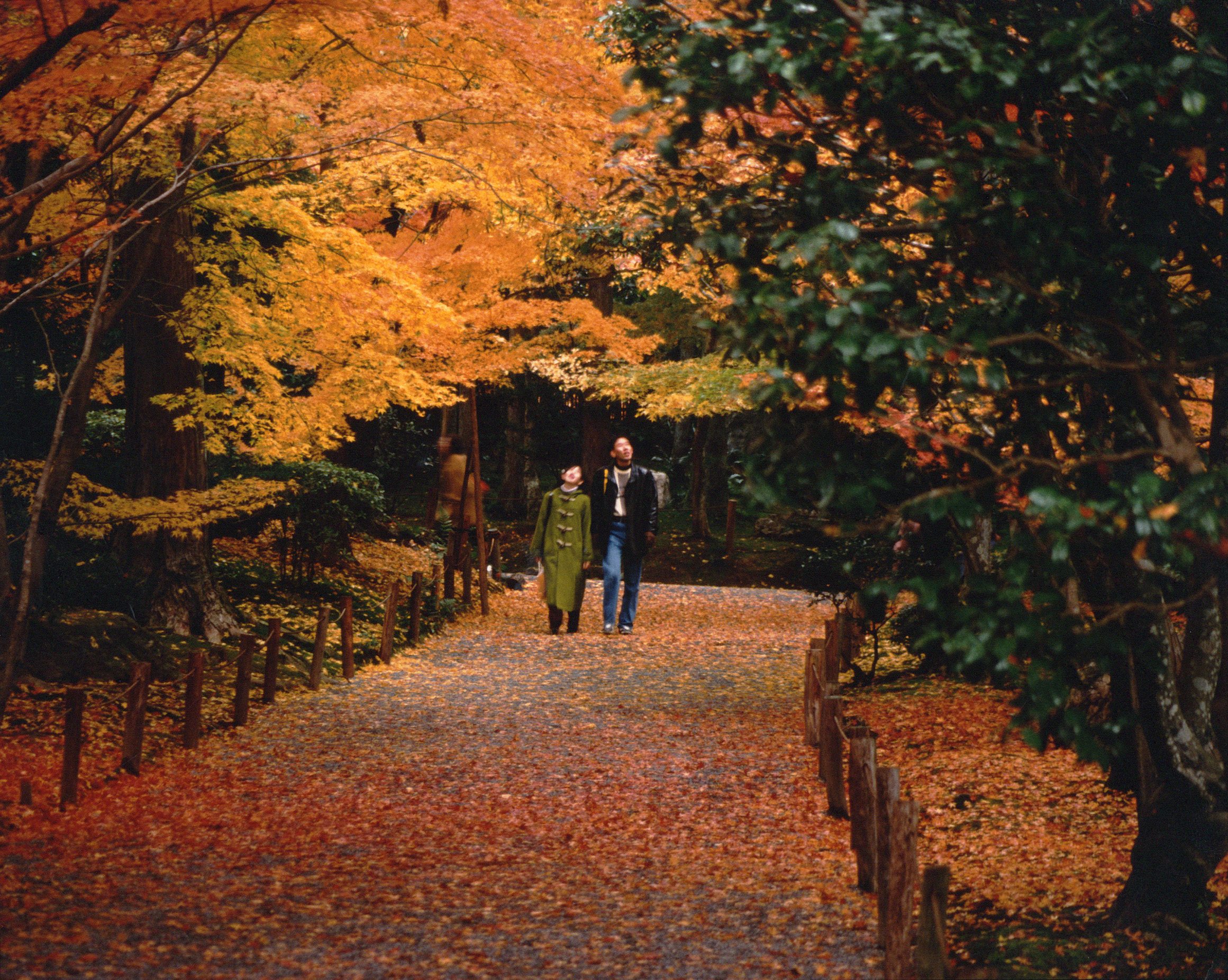
Leaf peeping (Momiji)

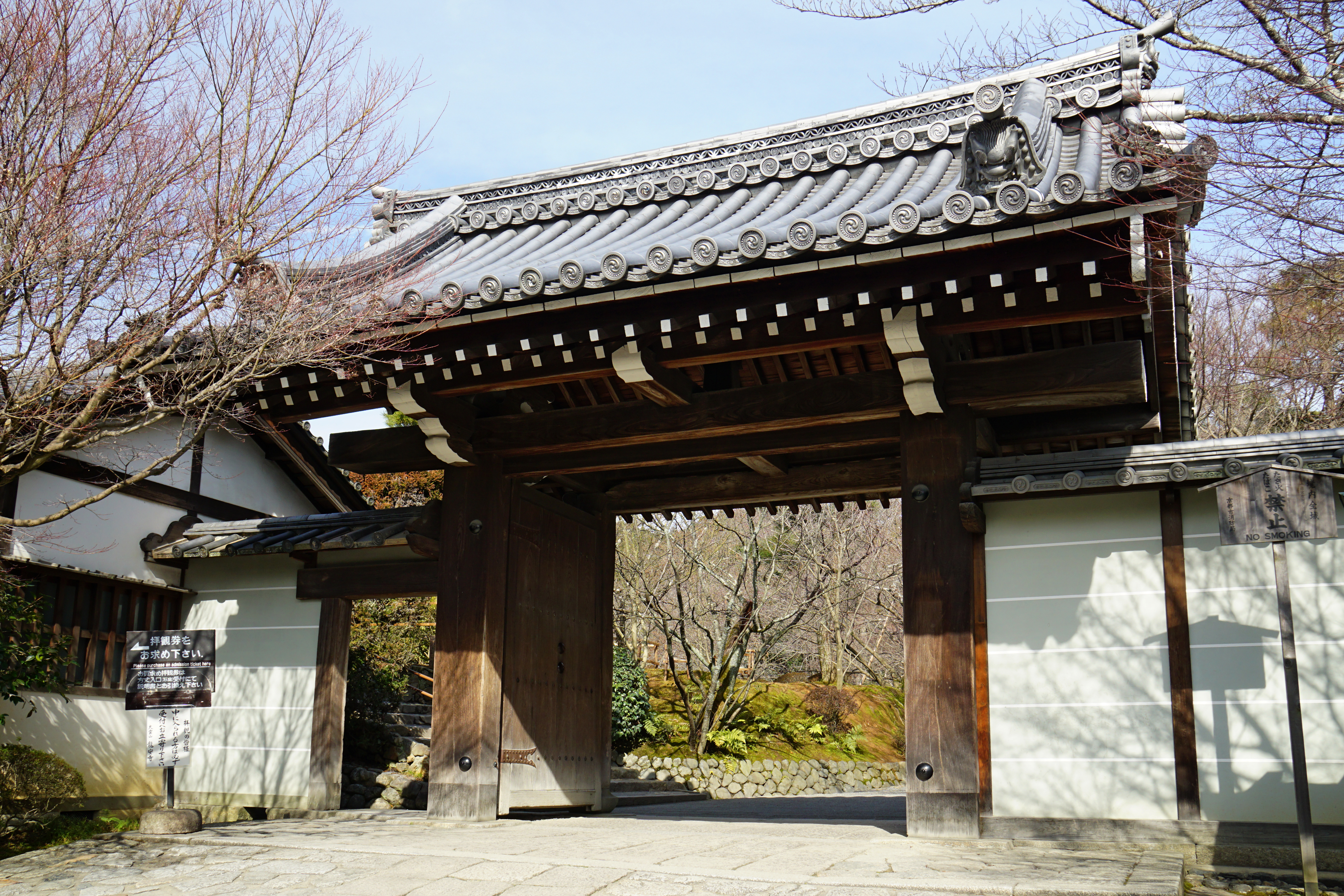
Sanmon gate to the temple

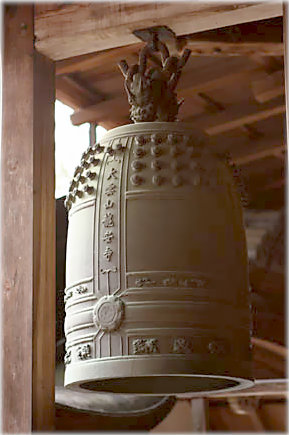
Temple bell at Ryōan-ji

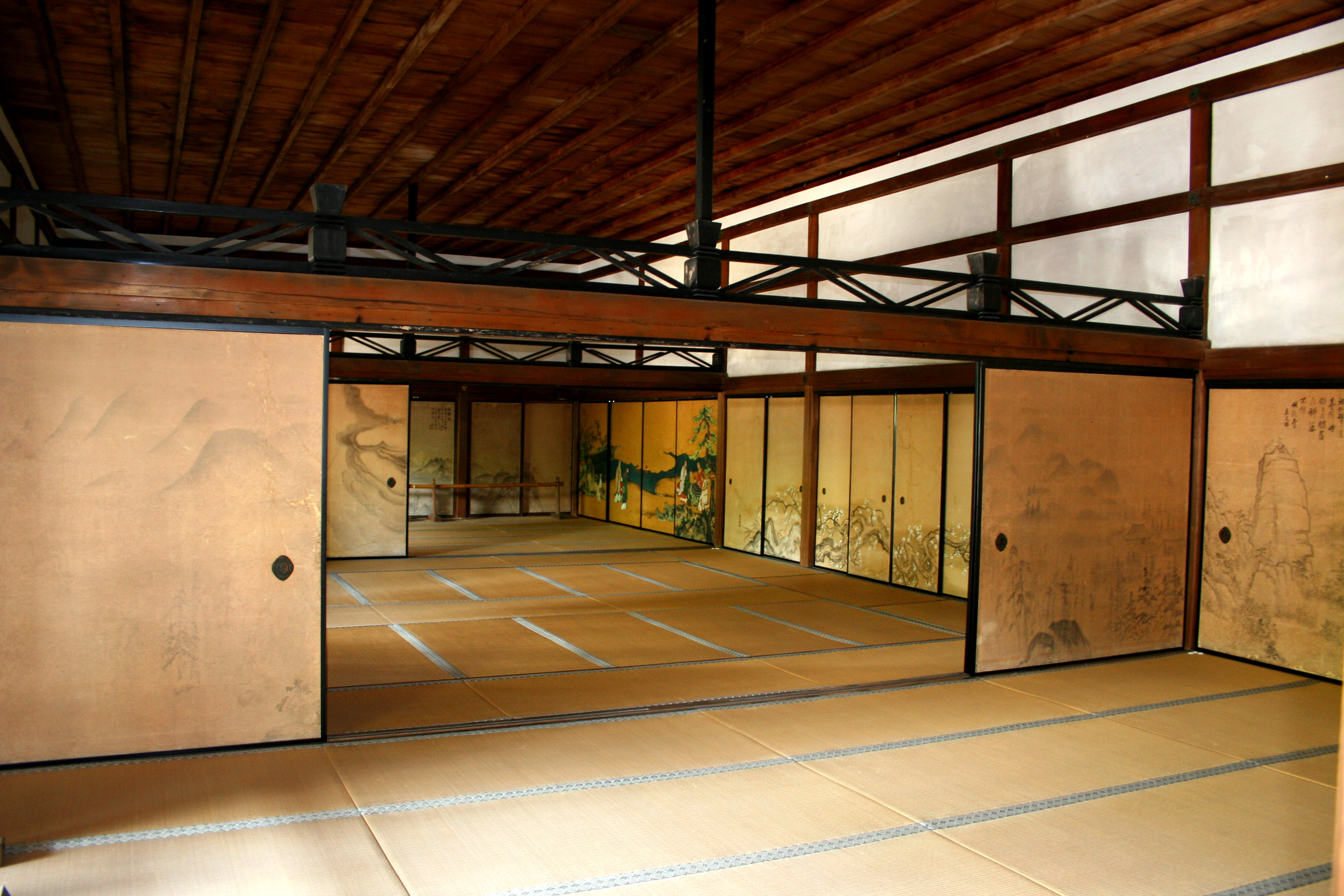
Interior of the Hojo, the main temple building

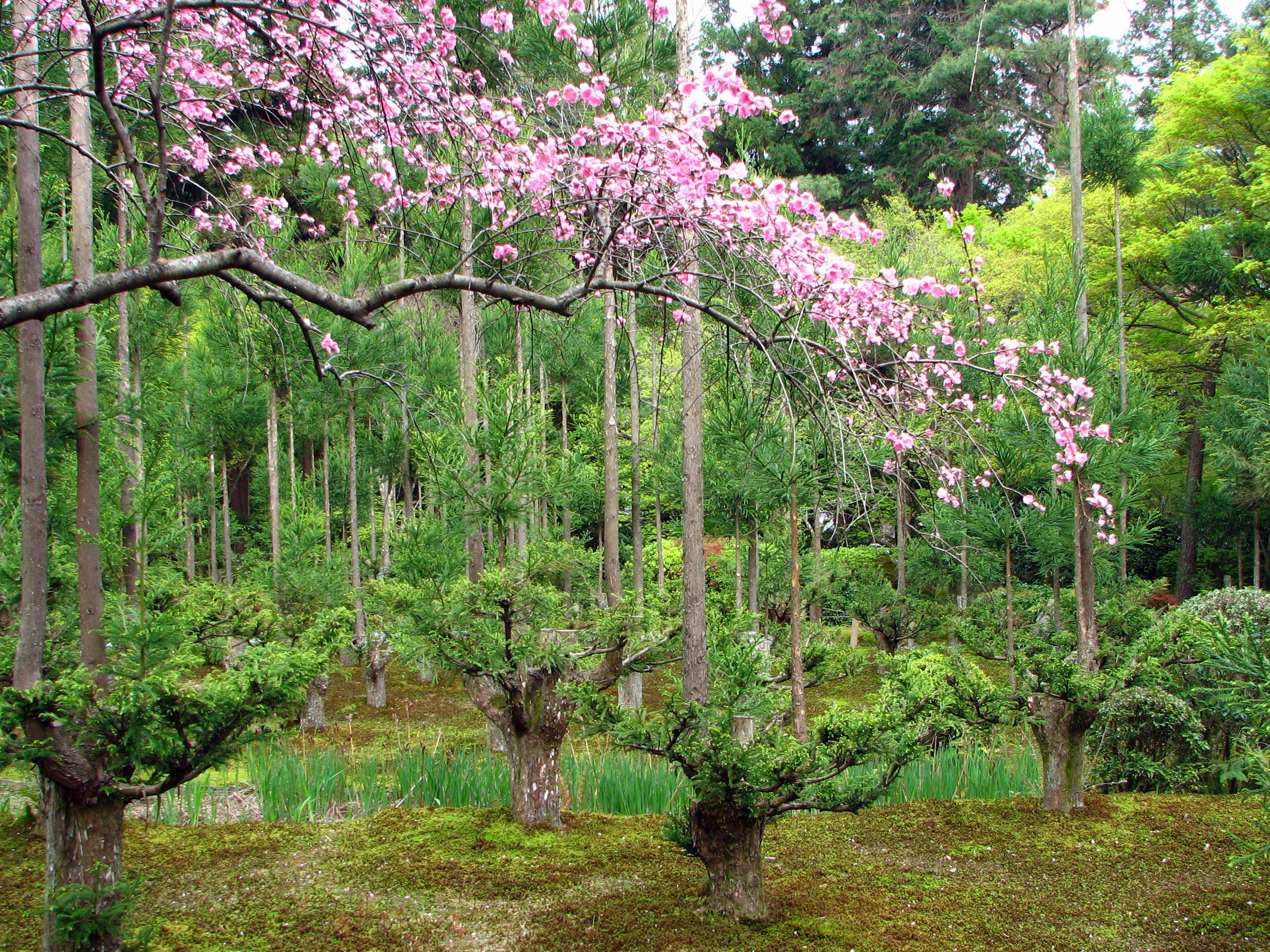
Daisugi trees at the gardens

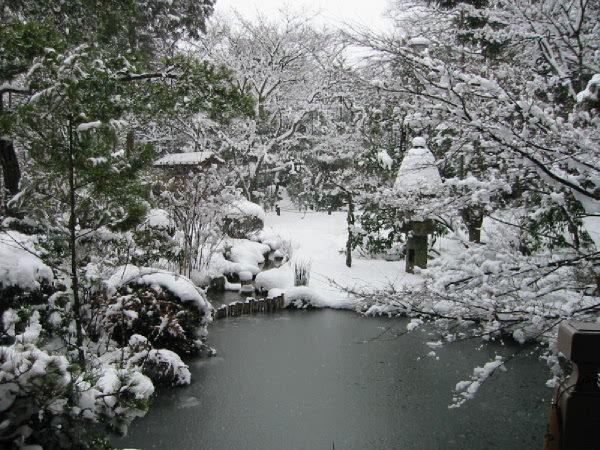
The garden outside the teahouse (winter)

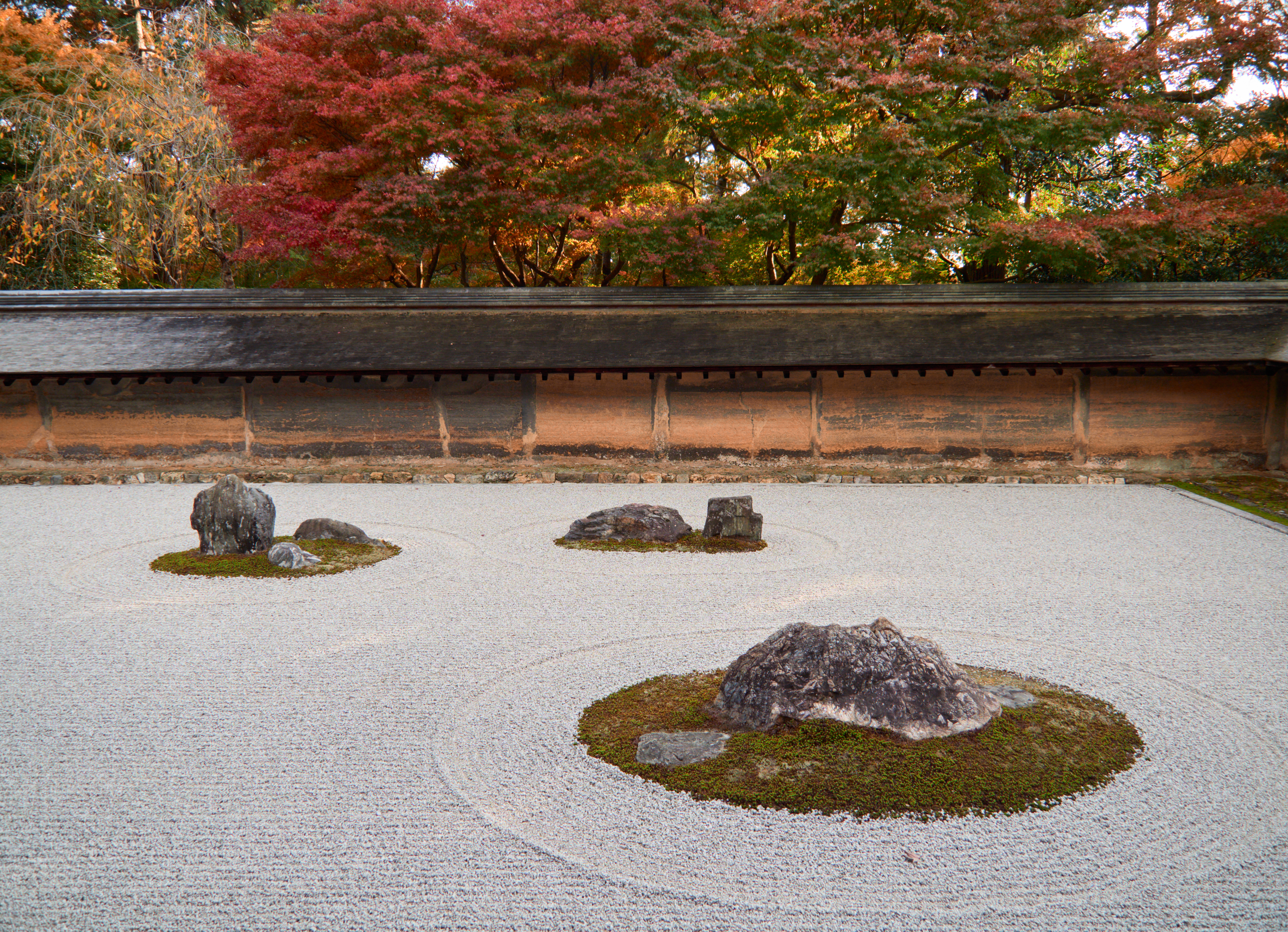
Rock garden (right side) in Autumn

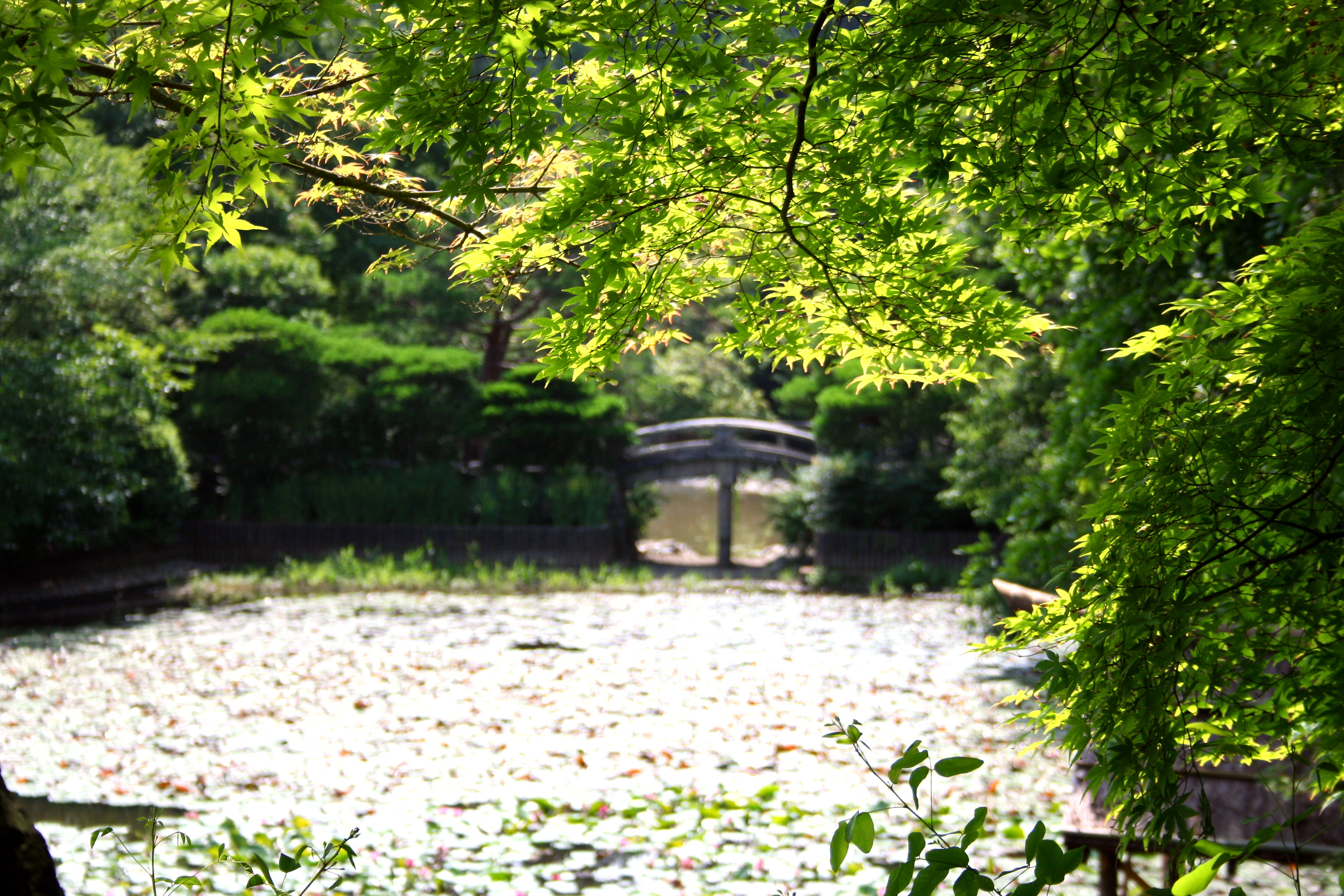
Lake and bridge outside the main buildings of the central unit (summer)

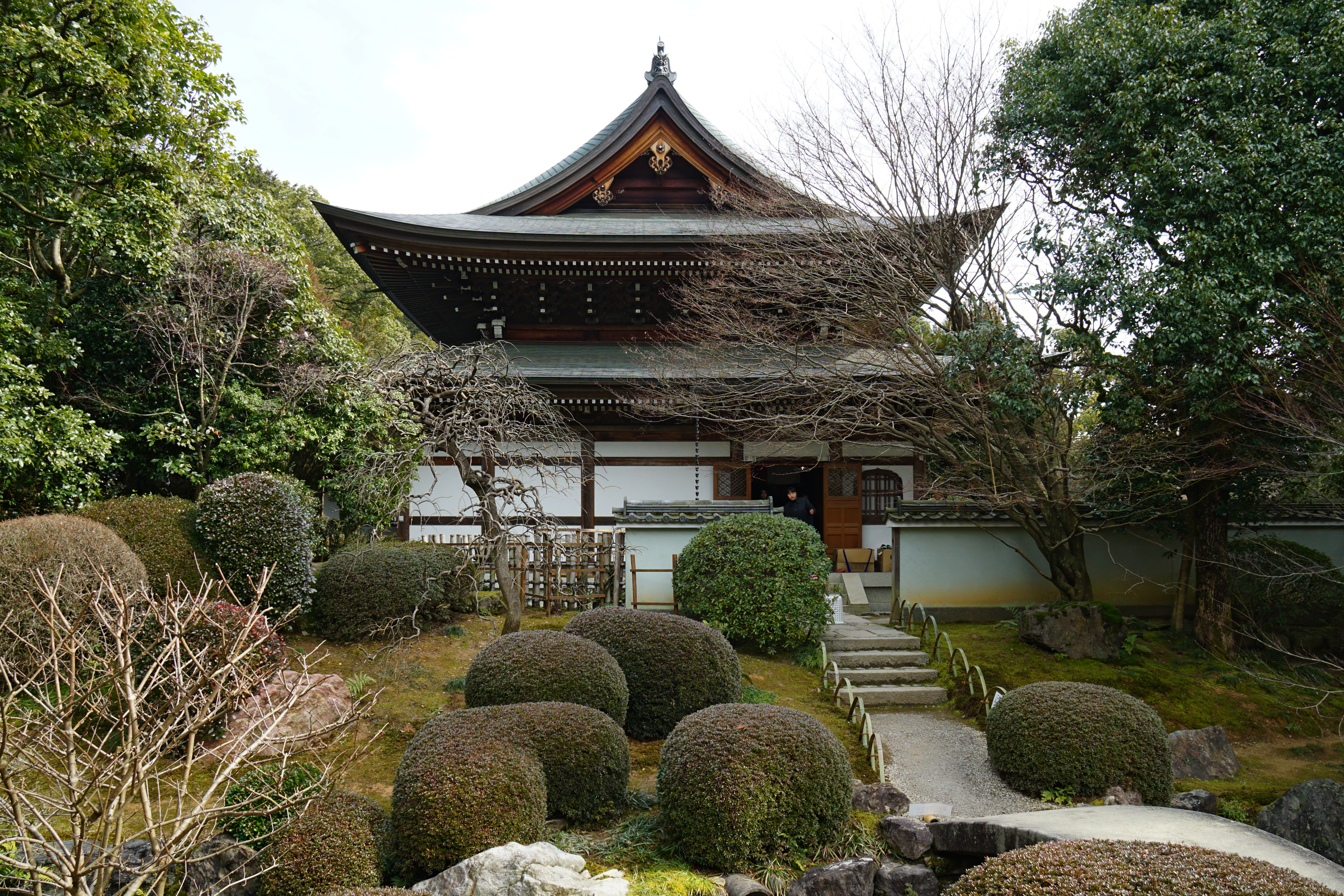
Butsuden

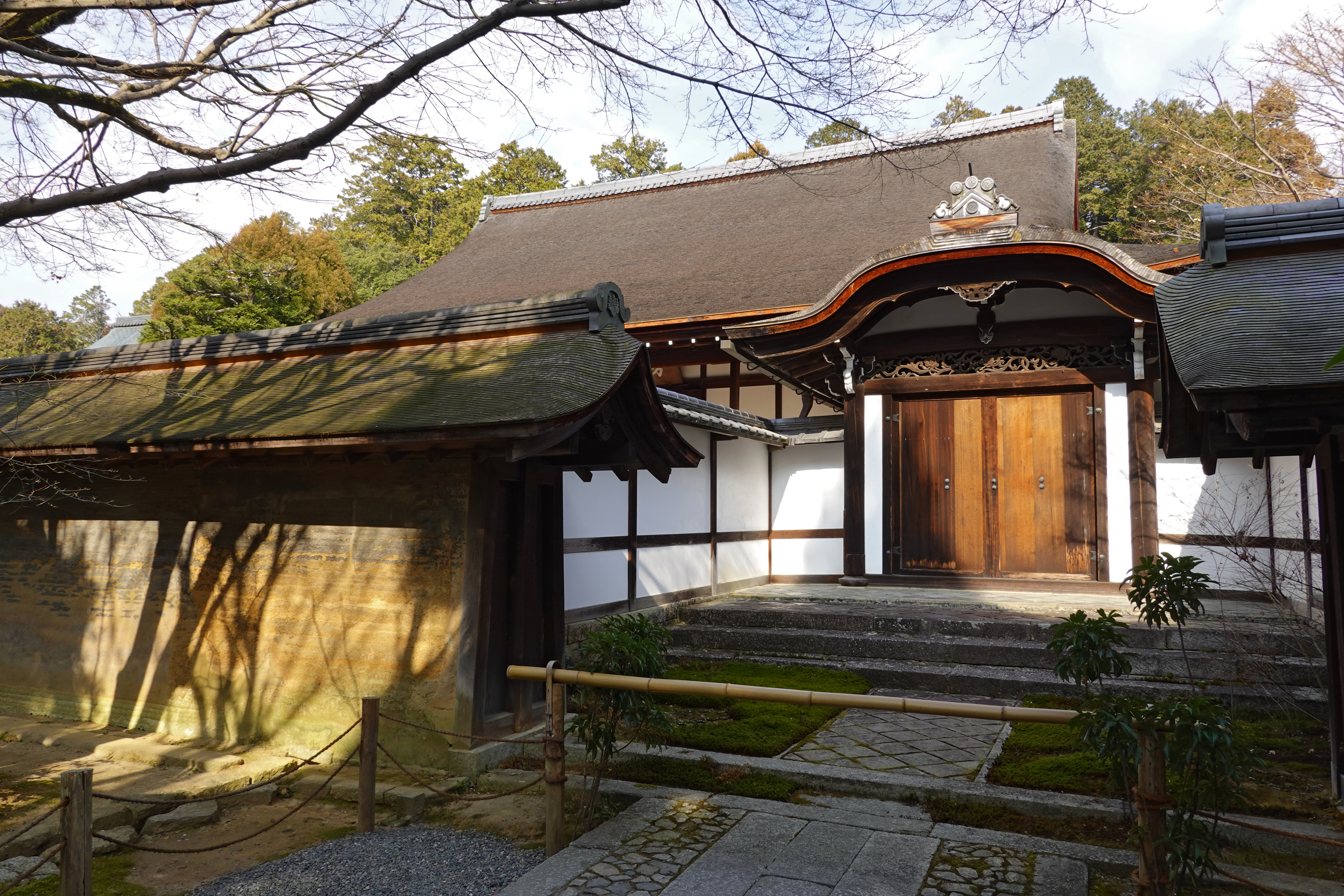
Chokushimon

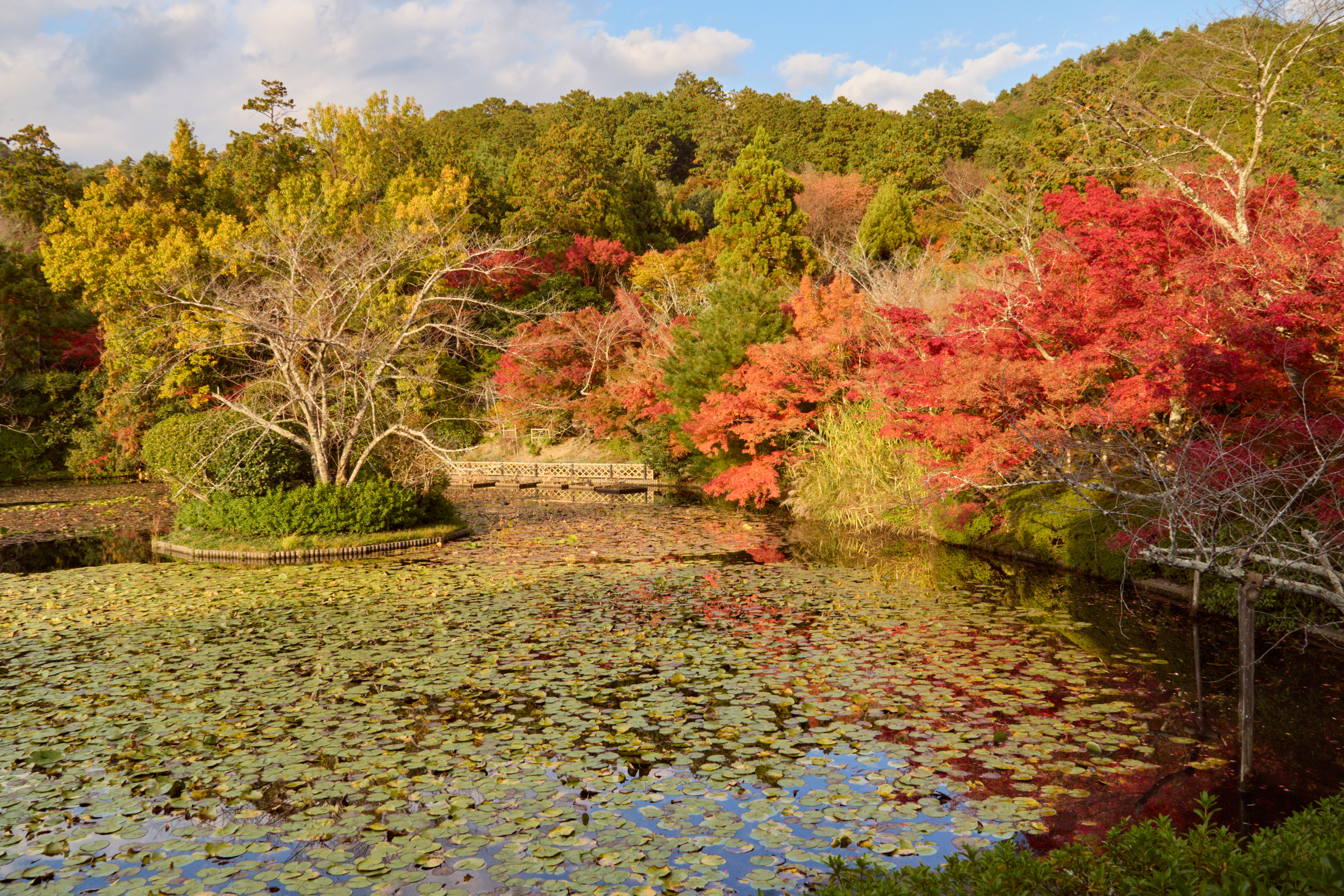
Gardens in autumn

== See also ==
- List of Special Places of Scenic Beauty, Special Historic Sites and Special Natural Monuments
- Higashiyama culture in Muromachi period
- Japanese garden
- Tourism in Japan
- List of compositions by John Cage
