= Chōzubachi =

Japanese water bowl for ritual handwashing

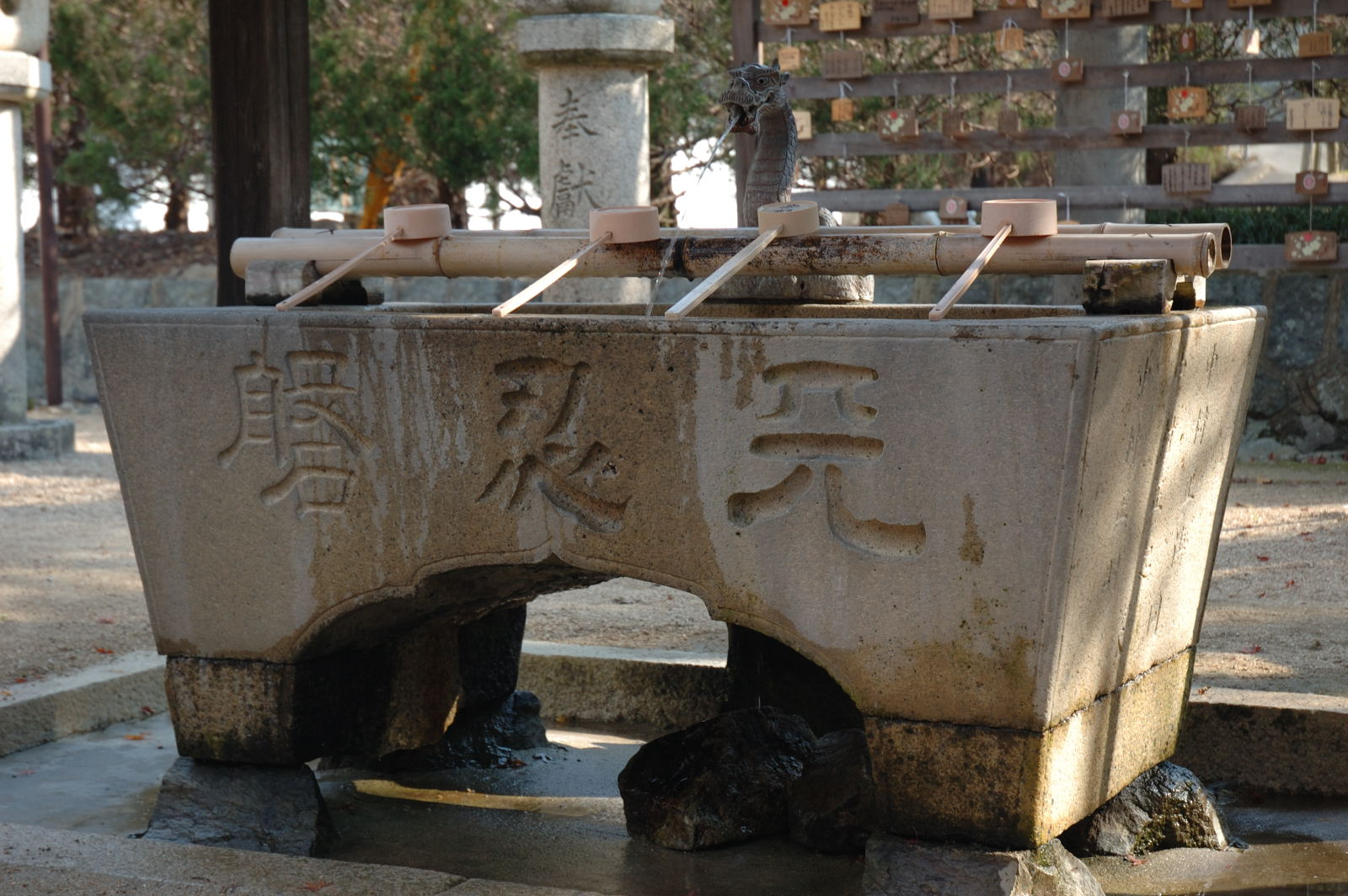
Chōzubachi at a temple

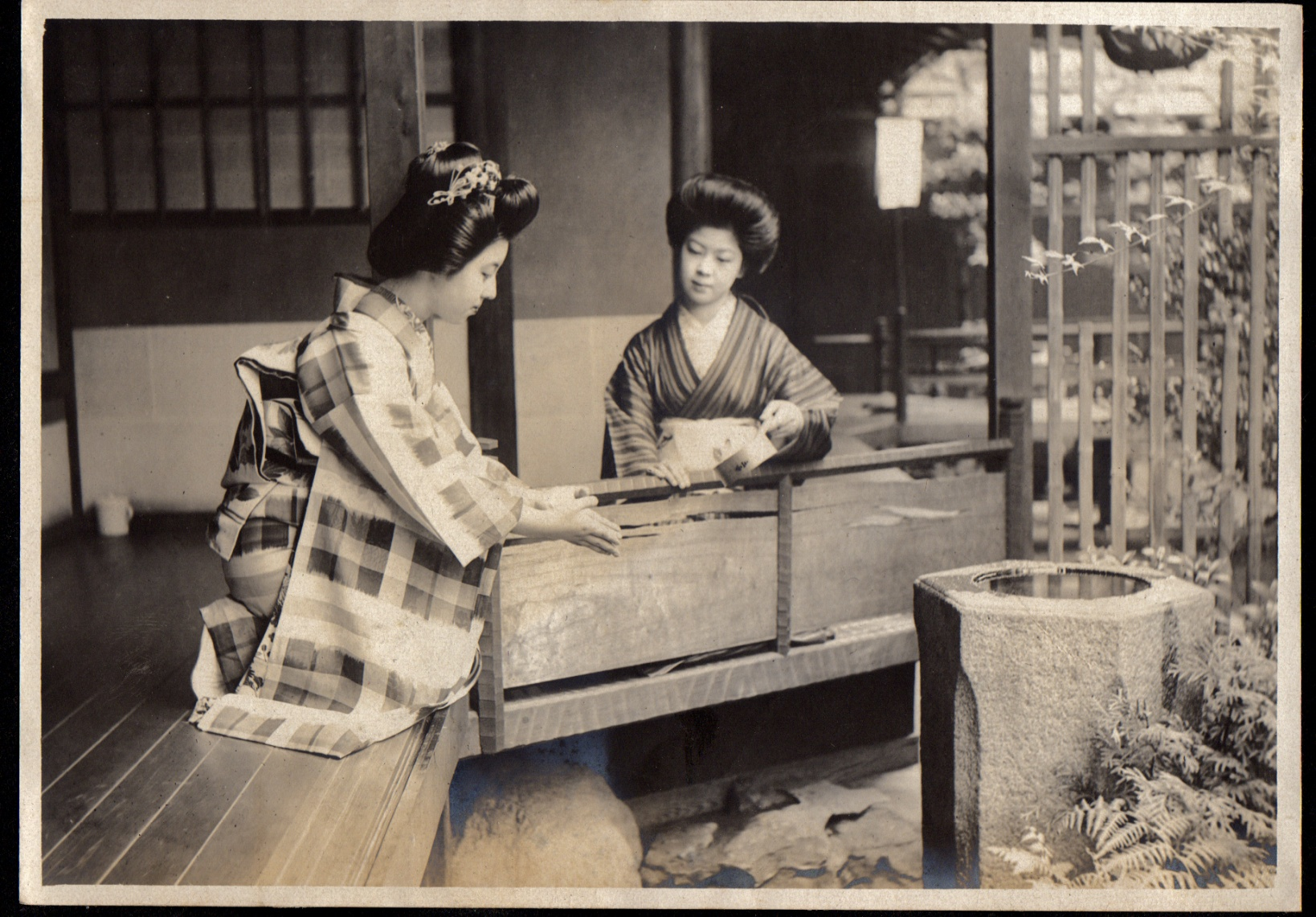
Performing temizu from a domestic chōzu-bachi, 1910s

A chōzubachi (手水鉢), or water bowl, is a vessel used to rinse the hands in Japanese temples, shrines and gardens. Usually made of stone, it plays an important role in the tea ceremony. Guests use it to wash their hands before entering the tearoom, a practice originally adapted from the custom of rinsing one’s mouth and cleansing one’s body in the chōzuya before entering the sacred precincts of a Shinto shrine or a Buddhist temple.

Prior to modern plumbing, Japanese homes contained a chōzu-bachi with a dipper, and provisions for drainage of wastewater, placed so that it could be used from the engawa (veranda or corridor). A towel was often hung nearby. One would be placed near the entrance of a latrine, though there might also be chōzu-bachi elsewhere.

There are many types of chōzu-bachi; for instance, a low chōzu-bachi, with attendant stones, is called a tsukubai and is often found in tea-gardens. Chōzu-bachi are usually stone, but may be made of other materials, such as ceramic or bronze.

== Gallery ==
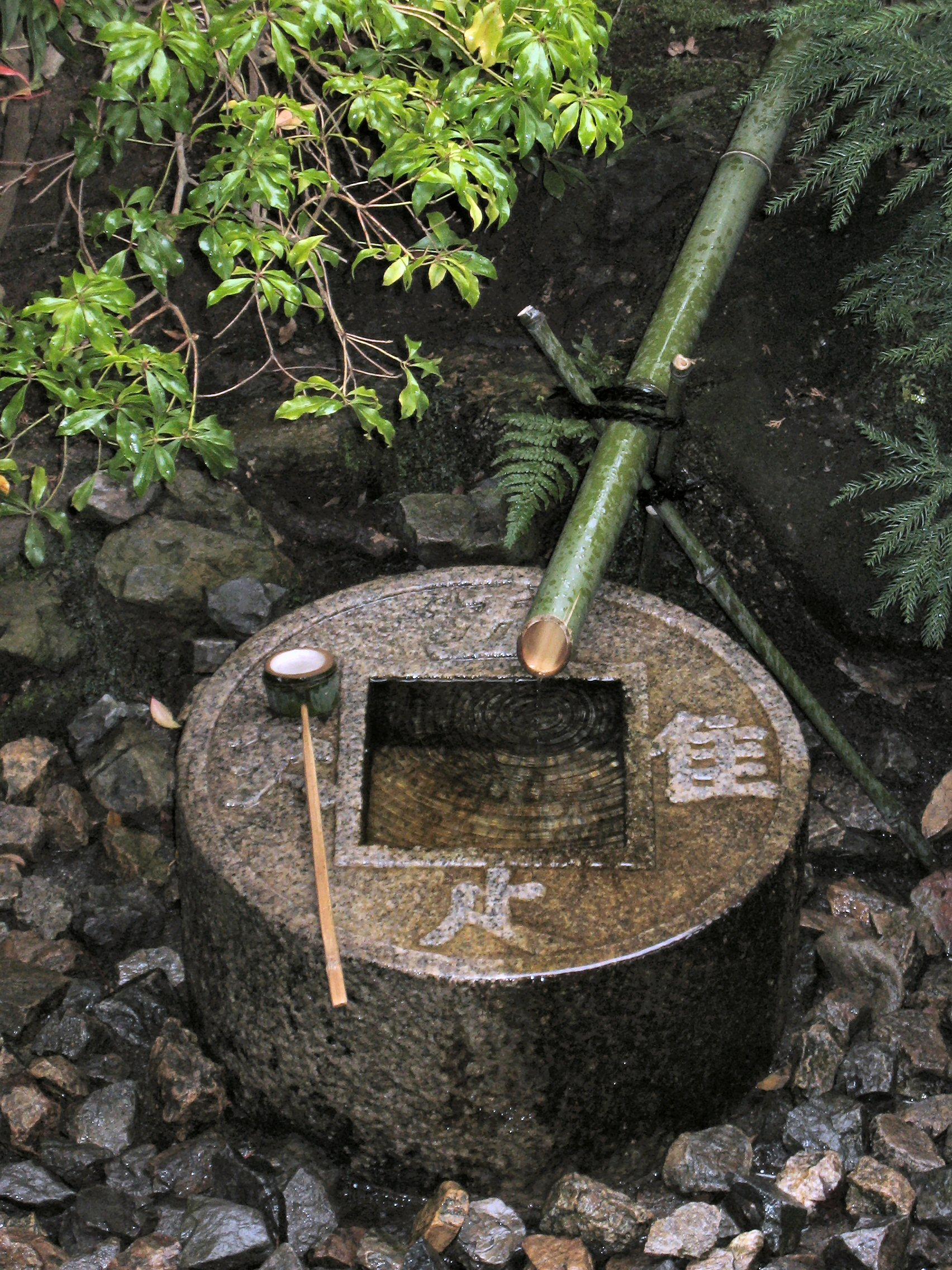
A famous tsukubai

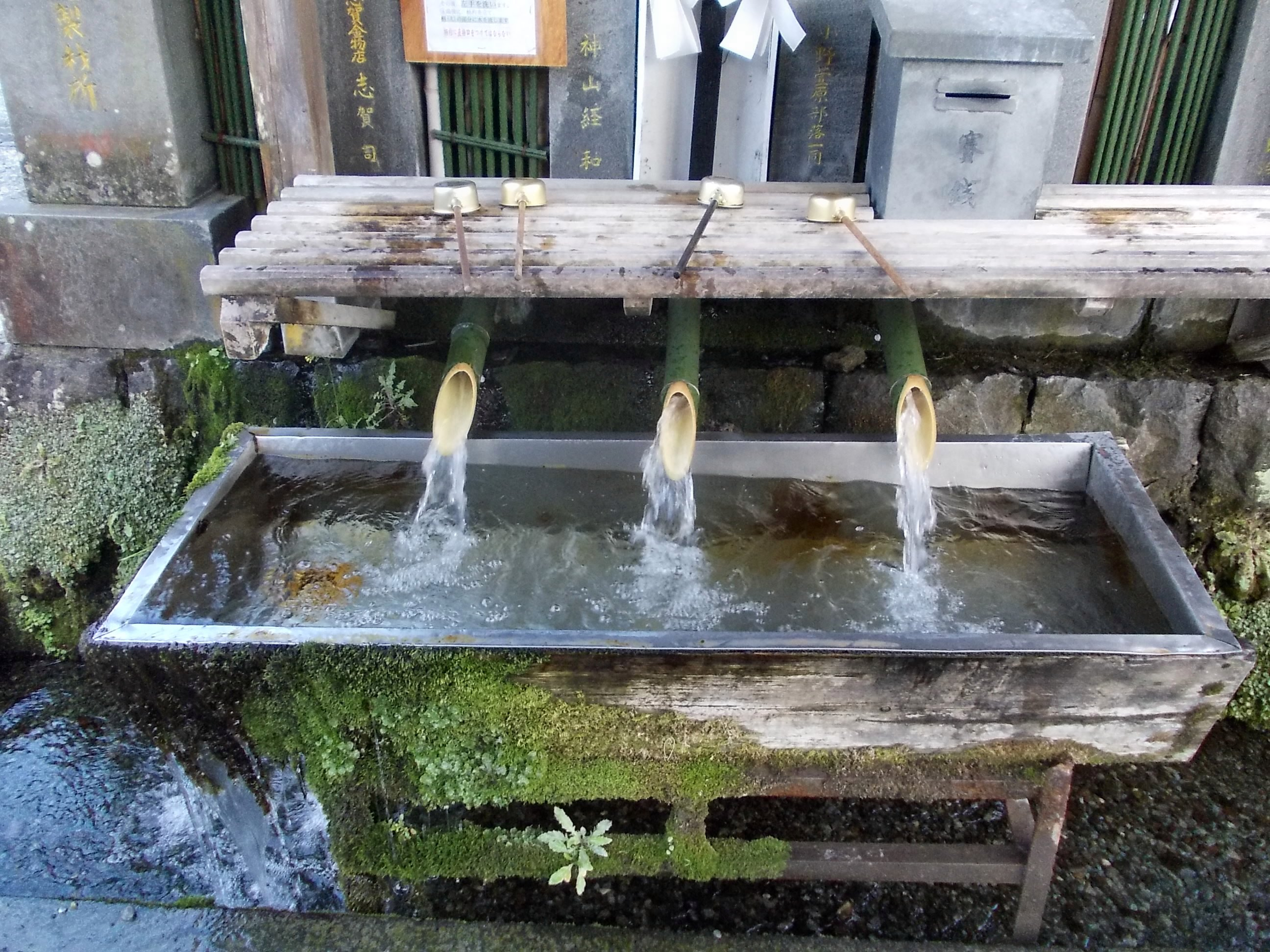
A chōzubachi at Aso Shrine

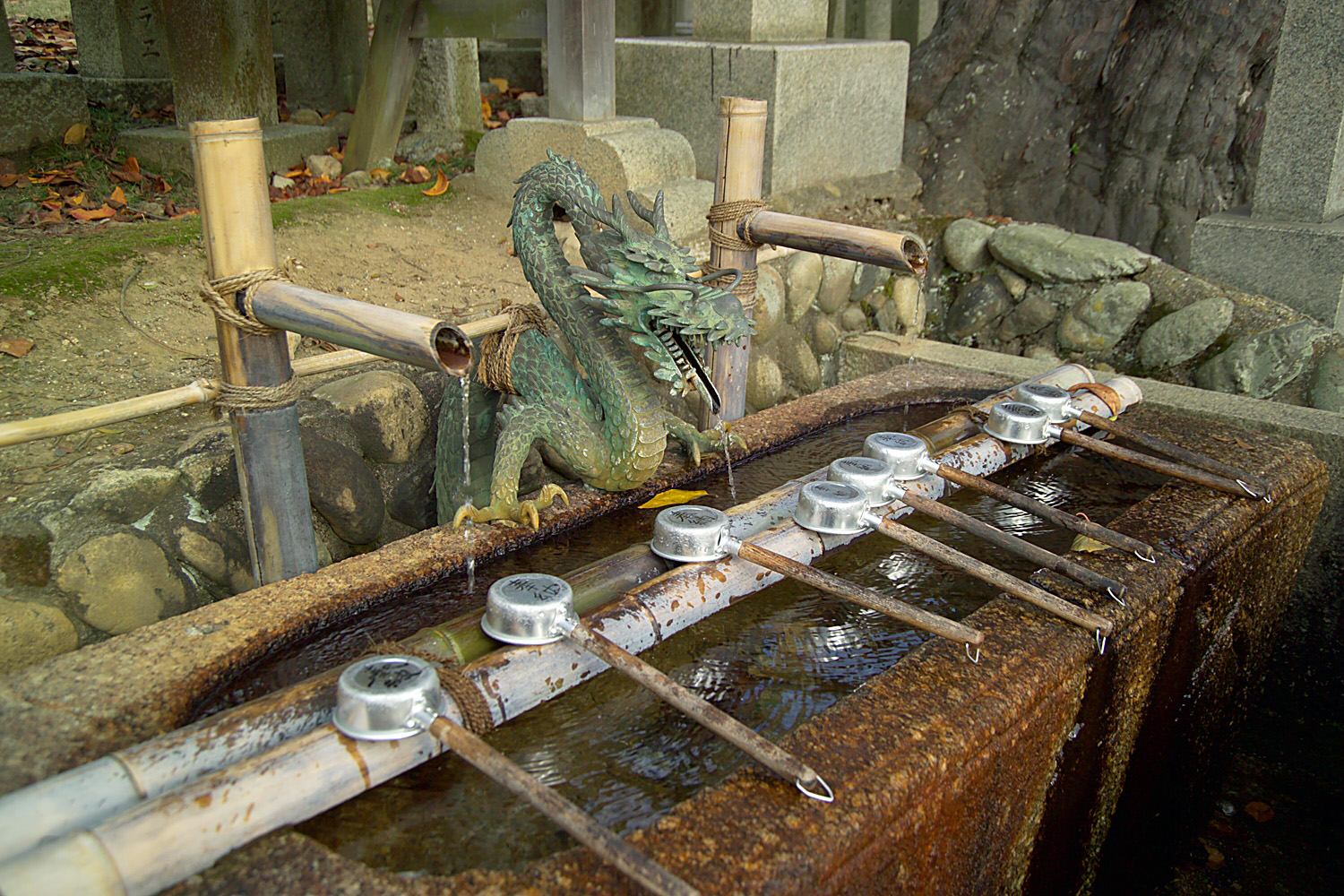
A chōzubachi at Tōdai-ji

A continuous stream of water enters.

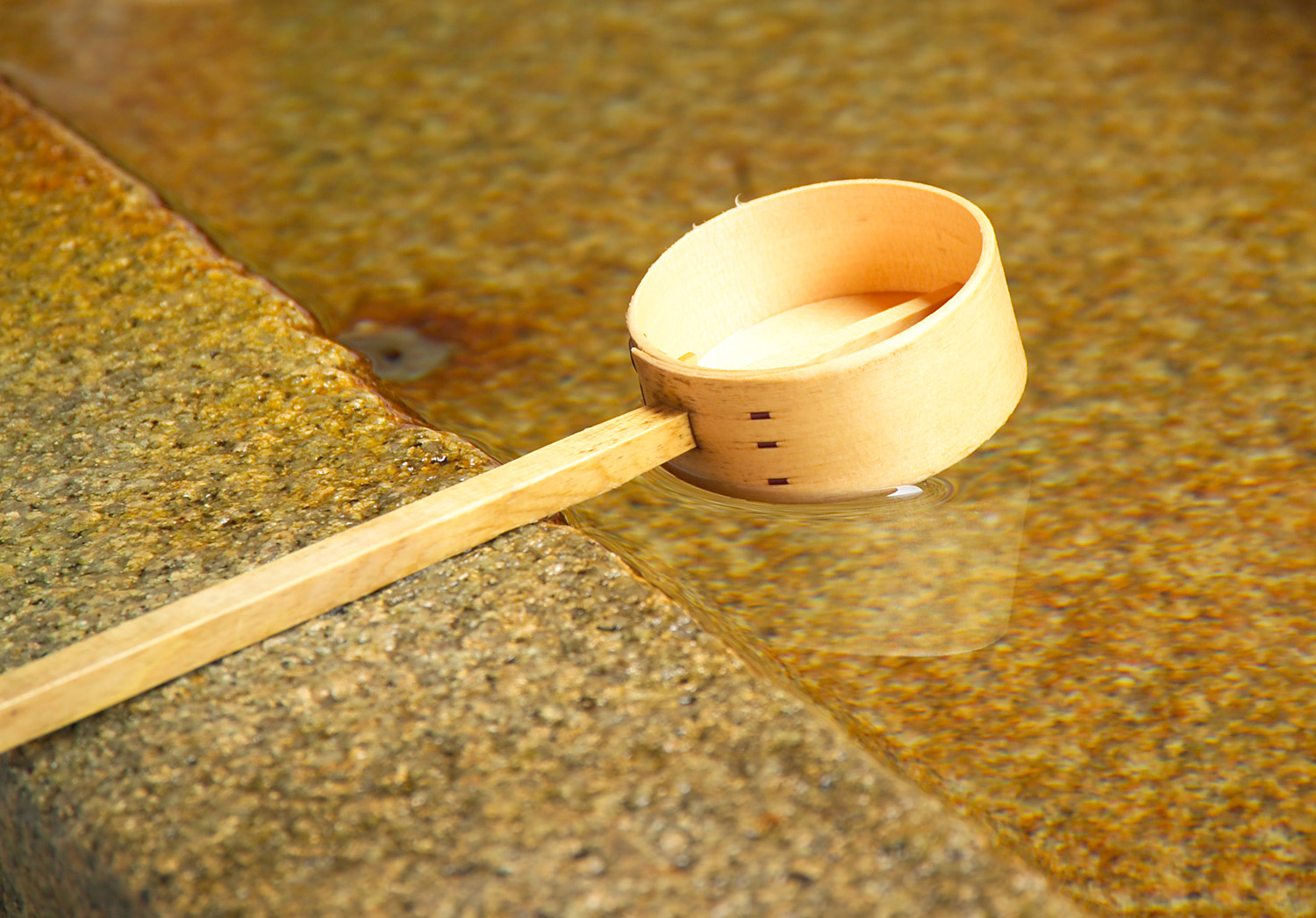
A Hishaku

== See also ==
- Chōzuya
