= Tsukubai =

Traditional Japanese ritual washbasin

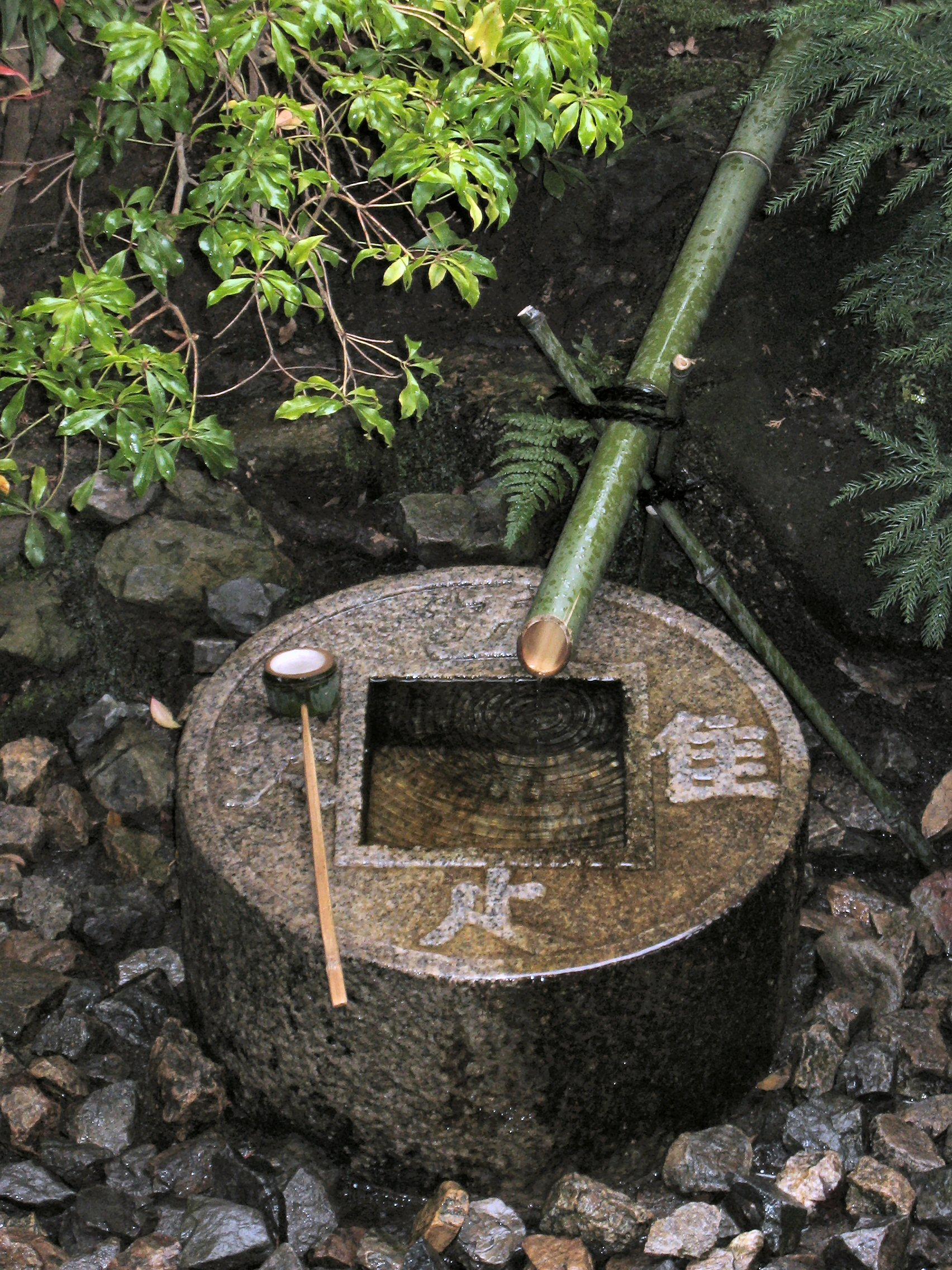
The tsukubai at Ryōan-ji temple in Kyoto

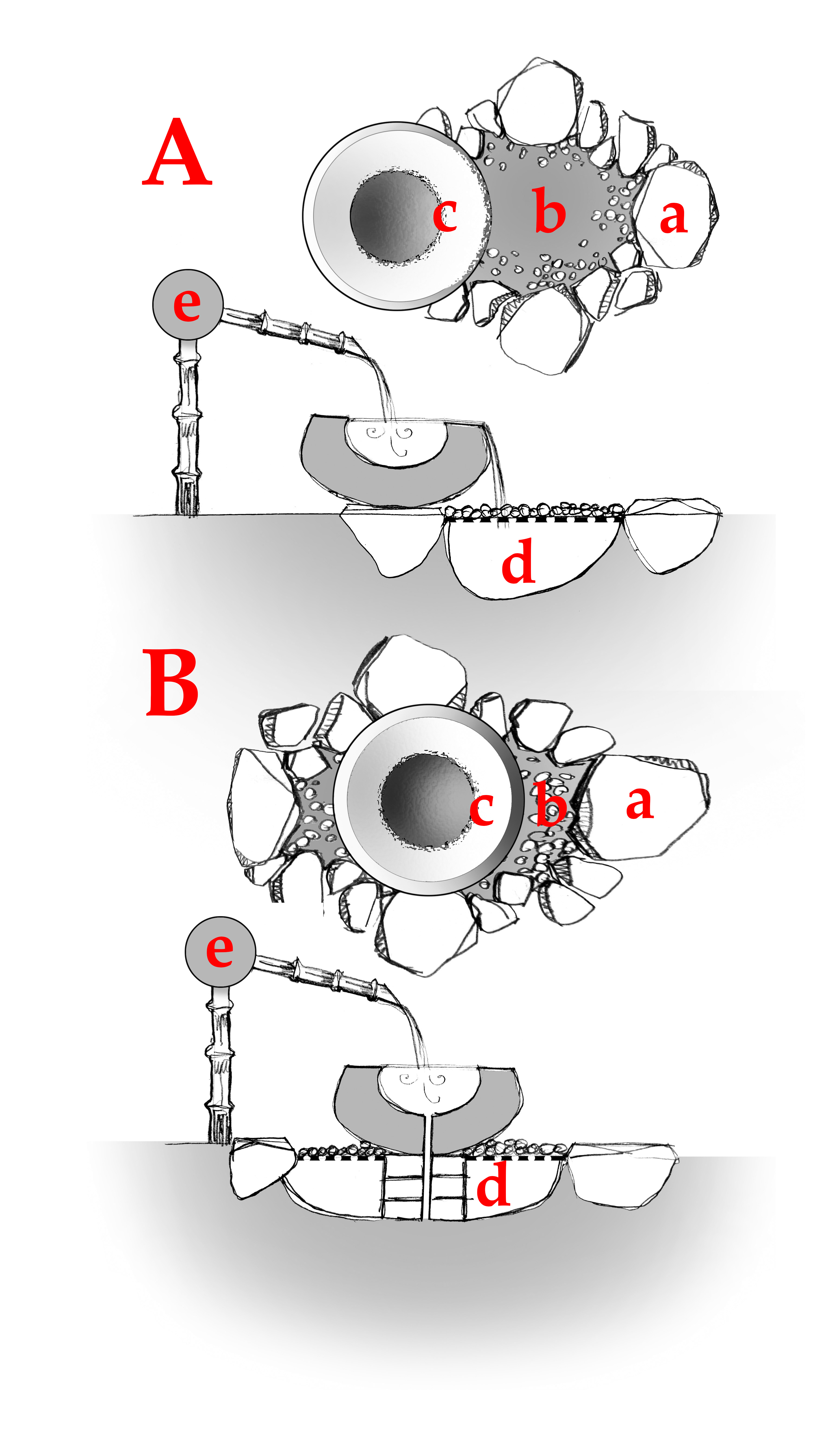
Tsukubai types: A) placed at the "edge of the sea" and B) placed in the "center of the sea"

In Japan, a tsukubai (蹲踞) is a washbasin provided at the entrance to a holy place for visitors to purify themselves by the ritual washing of hands and rinsing of the mouth. This type of ritual cleansing is the custom for guests attending a tea ceremony or visiting the grounds of a Buddhist temple. The name originates from the verb tsukubau, meaning "to crouch" or "to bow down", an act of humility. Guests attending a tea ceremony crouch and wash their hands in a tsukubai set in the tea garden (roji) before entering the tearoom.

Tsukubai are usually of stone, and are often provided with a small ladle, ready for use. A supply of water may be provided via a bamboo pipe called a kakei.

The famous tsukubai shown here stands in the grounds of the Ryōan-ji temple in Kyoto, and was donated by the feudal lord Tokugawa Mitsukuni. The kanji written on the surface of the stone are without significance when read alone. If each is read in combination with 口 (kuchi), the shape of the central bowl, then the characters become 吾, 唯, 足, 知 which translates literally as "I only know plenty" (吾 = ware = I, 唯 = tada = only, 足 = taru = plenty, 知 = shiru = know). The underlying meaning, variously translated as "what one has is all one needs", or "learn only to be content" reflects the basic anti-materialistic teachings of Buddhism.

== See also ==
- Suikinkutsu, a musical cave to drain handwashing water
- Chōzuya (or tsukubai), a Shinto water ablution pavilion
- Ritual purification
