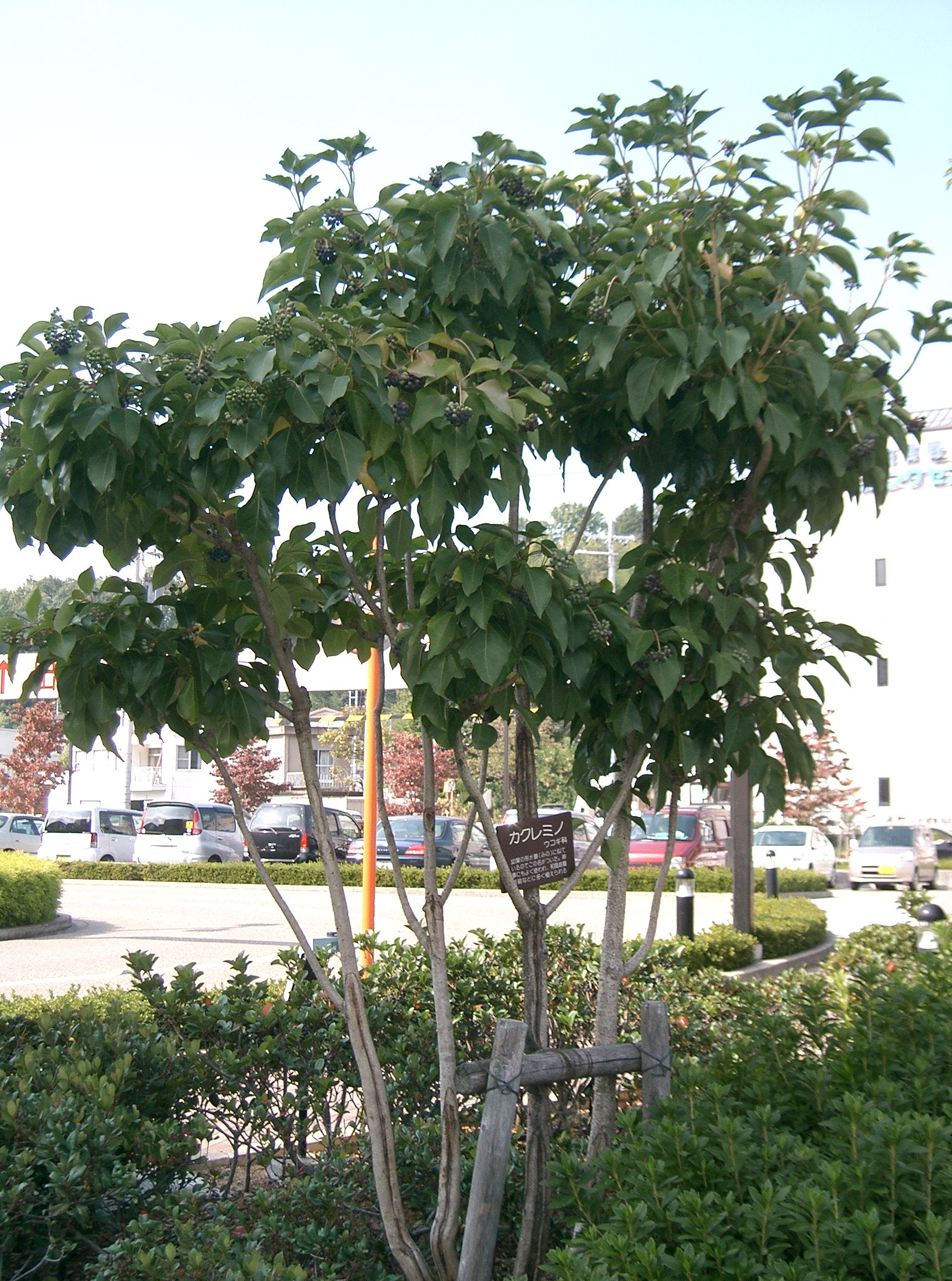
- Dendropanax trifidus

Scientific classification
- Kingdom: Plantae
- Clade: Tracheophytes
- Clade: Angiosperms
- Clade: Eudicots
- Clade: Asterids
- Order: Apiales
- Family: Araliaceae
- Subfamily: Aralioideae
- Genus: Dendropanax; Decne. & Planch.

Species
- Dendropanax affinis; Dendropanax alberti-smithii; Dendropanax amplifolius; Dendropanax arboreus; Dendropanax bilocularis; Dendropanax blakeanus; Dendropanax bolivianus; Dendropanax borneensis; Dendropanax bracteatus; Dendropanax brasiliensis; Dendropanax brevistylus; Dendropanax burmanicus; Dendropanax caloneurus; Dendropanax capillaris; Dendropanax caucanus; Dendropanax chevalieri; Dendropanax colombianus; Dendropanax compactus; Dendropanax confertus; Dendropanax cordifolius; Dendropanax cuneatus; Dendropanax cuneifolius; Dendropanax dariensis; Dendropanax dentiger; Dendropanax elongatus; Dendropanax exilis; Dendropanax fendleri; Dendropanax filipes; Dendropanax glaberrimus; Dendropanax globosus; Dendropanax gonatopodus; Dendropanax gracilis; Dendropanax grandiflorus; Dendropanax grandis; Dendropanax hainanensis; Dendropanax heterophyllus; Dendropanax hoi; Dendropanax hondurensis; Dendropanax inflatus; Dendropanax kwangsiensis; Dendropanax lancifolius; Dendropanax langbianensis; Dendropanax langsdorfii; Dendropanax larensis; Dendropanax latilobus; Dendropanax laurifolius; Dendropanax lehmannii; Dendropanax leptopodus; Dendropanax macrocarpus; Dendropanax macrophyllus; Dendropanax macropodus; Dendropanax maingayi; Dendropanax marginiferus; Dendropanax maritimus; Dendropanax monogynus; Dendropanax morbiferus; Dendropanax neblinae; Dendropanax nervosus; Dendropanax nutans; Dendropanax oblanceatus; Dendropanax oblongifolius; Dendropanax oliganthus; Dendropanax oligodontus; Dendropanax pachypodus; Dendropanax pallidus; Dendropanax palustris; Dendropanax panamensis; Dendropanax parvifloroides; Dendropanax pendulus; Dendropanax poilanei; Dendropanax populifolius; Dendropanax portlandianus; Dendropanax praestans; Dendropanax productus; Dendropanax proteus; Dendropanax punctatus; Dendropanax querceti; Dendropanax ravenii; Dendropanax resinosus; Dendropanax selleanus; Dendropanax sessiliflorus; Dendropanax siamensis; Dendropanax stellatus; Dendropanax swartzii; Dendropanax tessmannii; Dendropanax trifidus; Dendropanax trilobus; Dendropanax umbellatus; Dendropanax venosus; Dendropanax weberbaueri; Dendropanax williamsii; Dendropanax yunnanensis

Synonyms
- Gilibertia Ruiz & Pav.; Ginannia F.Dietr.; Mesopanax R.Vig.; Textoria Miq.; Wangenheimia F.Dietr.

= Dendropanax =

Genus of plants

Dendropanax is a genus of flowering plants in the family Araliaceae, consisting of 92 species of evergreen trees and shrubs, first described by Joseph Decaisne & Jules Émile Planchon in 1854. They are native to Central and South America, eastern Asia and the Malay Peninsula. Species such as Dendropanax trifidus or "kakuremino" in Japanese, are used in roji gardens, traditional moist and mossy areas leading to the chashitsu for tea ceremonies.
