= W. tinctoria =

W. tinctoria may refer to:

- Weinmannia tinctoria, a plant species found in Mauritius and Réunion
- Wrightia tinctoria, a plant species found in India

== See also ==
- Tinctoria
