= Weinmannia costulata =

Conservation status
- Vulnerable (IUCN 3.1)

Scientific classification
- Kingdom: Plantae
- Clade: Tracheophytes
- Clade: Angiosperms
- Clade: Eudicots
- Clade: Rosids
- Order: Oxalidales
- Family: Cunoniaceae
- Genus: Weinmannia
- Species: W. costulata

Binomial name
- Weinmannia costulata Cuatrec.

Species of flowering plant

Weinmannia costulata is a species of flowering plant in the family Cunoniaceae. It is a tree endemic to Ecuador. Its natural habitat is subtropical or tropical moist montane forests.

The species was described by José Cuatrecasas in 1949.
