= Dendropanax laurifolius =

Palo de Vaca

Conservation status
- Near Threatened (IUCN 3.1)

Scientific classification
- Kingdom: Plantae
- Clade: Tracheophytes
- Clade: Angiosperms
- Clade: Eudicots
- Clade: Asterids
- Order: Apiales
- Family: Araliaceae
- Genus: Dendropanax
- Species: D. laurifolius

Binomial name
- Dendropanax laurifolius Decne. & Planch.

Species of plant

Dendropanax laurifolius, commonly known as Palo de Vaca, is a tree in the family Araliaceae. It is endemic to Puerto Rico, and is found in moist regions of forests at middle or high elevations.
