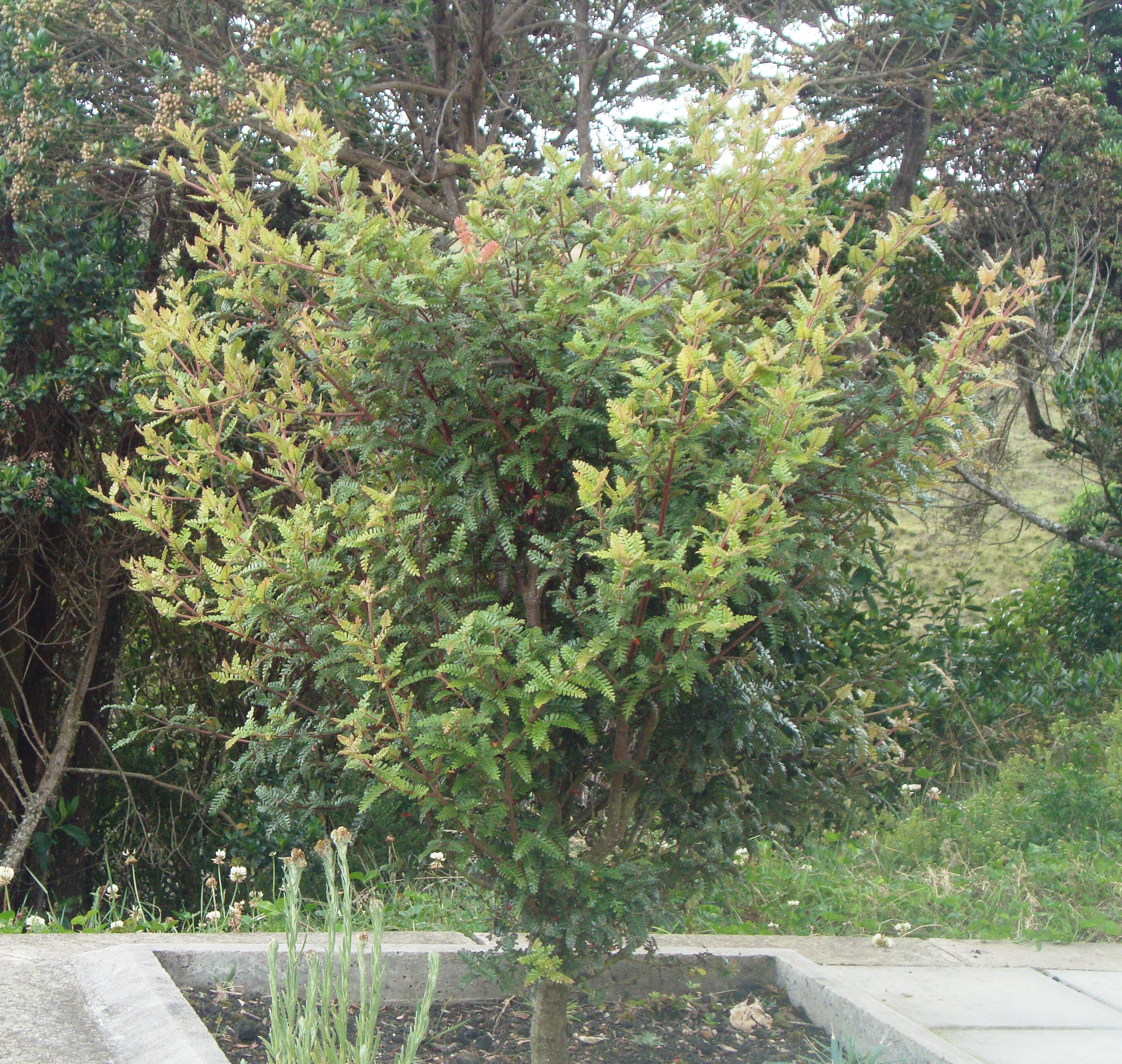
- Encenillo tree Weinmannia tomentosa is one of the most important species in the Colombian Andean cloud forest

Scientific classification
- Kingdom: Plantae
- Clade: Tracheophytes
- Clade: Angiosperms
- Clade: Eudicots
- Clade: Rosids
- Order: Oxalidales
- Family: Cunoniaceae
- Genus: Weinmannia
- Species: W. tomentosa

Binomial name
- Weinmannia tomentosa Decne. & Planch.

Synonyms
- Windmannia tomentosa

= Weinmannia tomentosa =

Encenillo

Species of tree

Weinmannia tomentosa, the encenillo, is a tree native of the highlands of the Andean region of Colombia, which belongs to the family Cunoniaceae. A synonym for Weinmannia tomentosa is Windmannia tomentosa.

== Description ==
It is a large (15–25 metres (49–82 ft)) tree, with small light green leaves (2–7 centimetres (0.79–2.76 in)), with white backside, and raquis with small wings of rhomboidal shape. alternated palmatilobulated (hand-shaped) leaves. The terminal branches are divided with thick nodes with similar shape to the human metacarpus. The flowers are small spicas (4–6 cm) creamy-white colored. Common names: encenillo, cáscaro, pelotillo.

== Environmental position ==
Encenillo is one of the best adapted trees of the sub-páramo, growing between 2500–3300 meters of altitude. It is often associated with Dendropanax colombianus, Miconia spp., Macleania rupestris, Cavendishia cordifolia, Myrsine spp. and Clusia multiflora. Before the colonial period, encenillo tree was one of the dominant species in the andean forests.

Some similar species are: Bogotan encenillo (Weinmannia bogotensis), wide-leaved encenillo (Weinmannia karsteniana), thick-leaved encenillo (Weinmannia auriculifera), round-leaved encenillo (Weinmannia rollotii) and mirth encenillo (Weinmannia myrtifolia).

== Uses ==
The encenillo tree is used as source of tanning substances for the leather industry, giving to the leather a beautiful reddish color. The wood is very appreciated in the timber industry and is used for cooking in the traditional preparation of the cheese arepas.
