= Weinmannia apurimacensis =

Conservation status
- Vulnerable (IUCN 2.3)

Scientific classification
- Kingdom: Plantae
- Clade: Tracheophytes
- Clade: Angiosperms
- Clade: Eudicots
- Clade: Rosids
- Order: Oxalidales
- Family: Cunoniaceae
- Genus: Weinmannia
- Species: W. apurimacensis

Binomial name
- Weinmannia apurimacensis O.C.Schmidt

Species of plant

Weinmannia apurimacensis is a species of flowering plant in the family Cunoniaceae. It is a tree endemic to Peru.

The species was described by Otto Christian Schmidt in 1931.
