= Weinmannia elliptica =

Conservation status
- Least Concern (IUCN 3.1)

Scientific classification
- Kingdom: Plantae
- Clade: Tracheophytes
- Clade: Angiosperms
- Clade: Eudicots
- Clade: Rosids
- Order: Oxalidales
- Family: Cunoniaceae
- Genus: Weinmannia
- Species: W. elliptica

Binomial name
- Weinmannia elliptica Kunth

Varieties
- Weinmannia elliptica var. elliptica; Weinmannia elliptica var. trichocarpa (Pamp.) Bernardi

Synonyms
- Windmannia elliptica (Kunth) Kuntze; synonyms of var. elliptica: Weinmannia auriculata var. glabra J.F.Macbr.; Weinmannia balbisiana var. ptariana Cuatrec.; Weinmannia balbisiana var. roraimensis (Pamp.) Bernardi; Weinmannia cardonae Cuatrec.; Weinmannia ovalis var. elliptica Pamp.; Weinmannia ovalis var. penicillata (Cuatrec.) Cuatrec.; Weinmannia ovalis var. petiolata Cuatrec.; Weinmannia ovalis var. roraimensis Pamp.; Weinmannia penicillata Cuatrec.; Weinmannia schomburgkii Engl.; synonyms of var. trichocarpa: Weinmannia trichocarpa Pamp.

Species of tree

Weinmannia elliptica is a species of flowering plant in the family Cunoniaceae. It is a tree native to Colombia, Ecuador, Peru, and Venezuela in northwestern South America. It grows in moist montane forests in the Andes from 2,300 to 3,600 metres elevation.

Two varieties are accepted:

- Weinmannia elliptica var. elliptica – Colombia, Ecuador, Peru, and Venezuela
- Weinmannia elliptica var. trichocarpa (Pamp.) Bernardi – Peru
