= Weinmannia loxensis =

Conservation status
- Vulnerable (IUCN 3.1)

Scientific classification
- Kingdom: Plantae
- Clade: Tracheophytes
- Clade: Angiosperms
- Clade: Eudicots
- Clade: Rosids
- Order: Oxalidales
- Family: Cunoniaceae
- Genus: Weinmannia
- Species: W. loxensis

Binomial name
- Weinmannia loxensis Harling

Species of flowering plant

Weinmannia loxensis is a species of plant in the family Cunoniaceae. It is endemic to Ecuador. Its natural habitat is subtropical or tropical moist montane forests.
