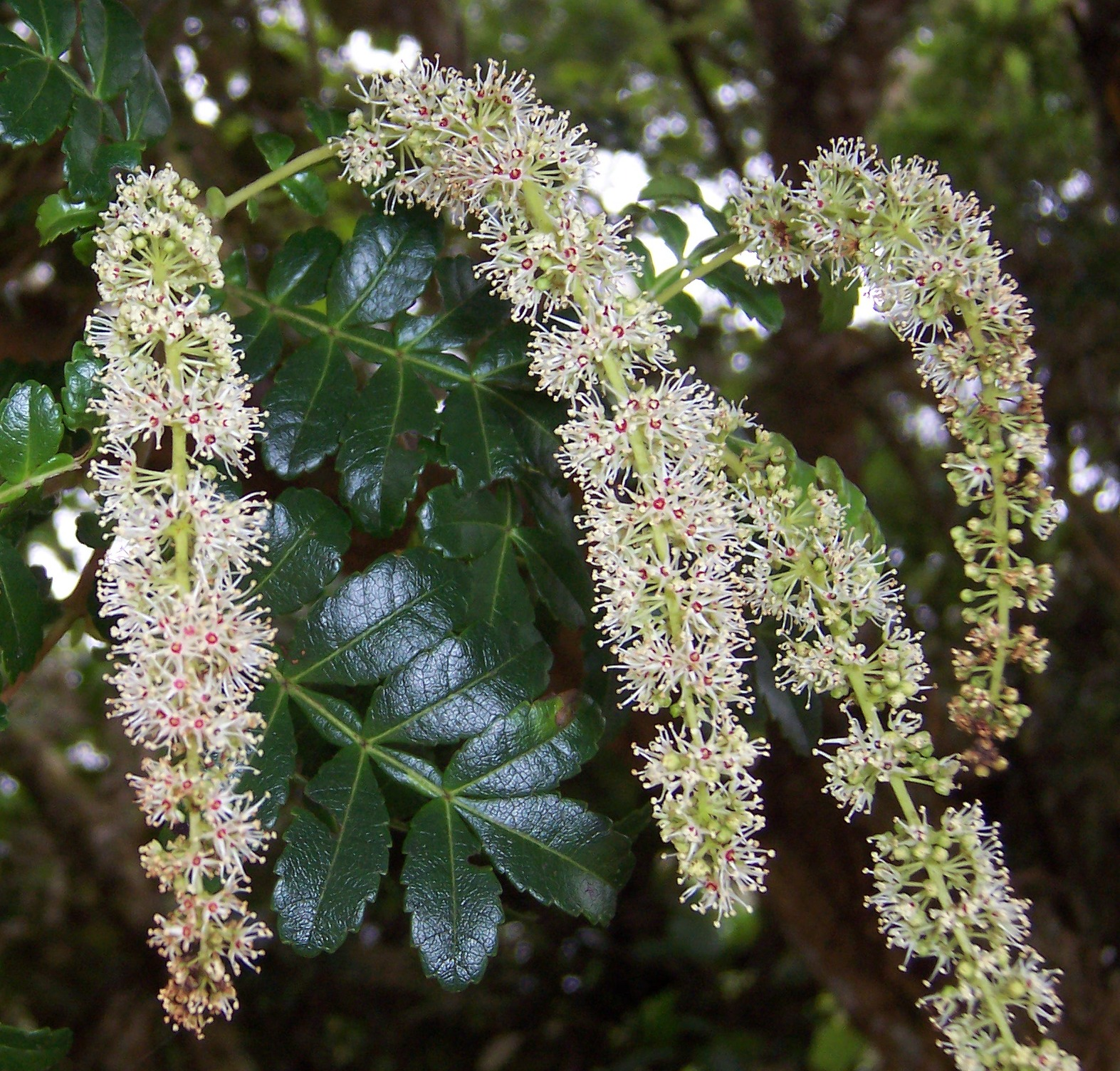
- Weinmannia tinctoria

Scientific classification
- Kingdom: Plantae
- Clade: Tracheophytes
- Clade: Angiosperms
- Clade: Eudicots
- Clade: Rosids
- Order: Oxalidales
- Family: Cunoniaceae
- Genus: Weinmannia; L.

Species
- See text

Synonyms
- Arnoldia Blume; Leiospermum D. Don; Pterophylla D. Don; Windmannia P.Browne

= Weinmannia =

Genus of flowering plants

Weinmannia is a genus of trees and shrubs in the family Cunoniaceae. It contains 90 species, which range from Mexico through Central and South America including the Caribbean, and to the Mascarene Islands (Mauritius and Réunion) in the western Indian Ocean. It is absent from mainland Africa and Australia, but some fossils have been attributed to Weinmannia in Australia.

Leaves are simple or pinnate, with a margin usually toothed, and interpetiolar stipules. Flowers are bisexual, white, arranged in racemes. The fruit is a capsule opening vertically from the top to the base. Seeds hairy without wings.

== Species ==
90 species are currently accepted:

- Weinmannia abstrusa J.F.Morales – Honduras
- Weinmannia anisophylla Standl. & L.O.Williams – Colombia, Costa Rica, Guatemala, Honduras
- Weinmannia apurimacensis O.C. Schmidt – southeastern Peru
- Weinmannia auriculata D.Don – Colombia, Ecuador, Peru, northwestern Venezuela
  - var. bogotensis (Cuatrec.) Bernardi
  - var. dryadifolia (Moric. ex Ser.) Bernardi
- Weinmannia auriformis Z.S.Rogers – Ecuador
- Weinmannia baccariniana Pamp. – Venezuela and Peru
- Weinmannia balbisiana Kunth – southeastern Mexico to Bolivia
  - var. calothyrsa (Diels) Cuatrec.
- Weinmannia bangii (Rusby) Engl. – Peru and Bolivia
- Weinmannia boliviensis R.E. Fr. – Bolivia
- Weinmannia brachystachya Willd. ex Engl. – Peru and southern Venezuela
- Weinmannia bradfordiana Z.S.Rogers – Ecuador
- Weinmannia burserifolia Standl. – Nicaragua, Costa Rica, Panama
- Weinmannia chryseis Diels – Colombia and Peru
- Weinmannia cinerea Ruiz & Pav. – Peru
- Weinmannia cochensis Hieron. – Colombia and Ecuador
- Weinmannia cogolloi J. F. Morales – Colombia
- Weinmannia condorensis Z.S.Rogers – Ecuador
- Weinmannia corocoroensis J.Bradford & P.E.Berry – Venezuela
- Weinmannia costulata Cuatrec. – southern Ecuador
- Weinmannia crassifolia Ruiz & Pav. – Peru and Bolivia
- Weinmannia cundinamarcensis Cuatrec. – Colombia, Peru, and western Bolivia
- Weinmannia cymbifolia Diels – Peru
- Weinmannia davidsonii A.Fuentes & Z.S.Rogers – Bolivia
- Weinmannia descendens Diels – northern Peru
- Weinmannia discolor Gardner – southeastern and southern Brazil
- Weinmannia dzieduszyckii Szyszył. – Peru
- Weinmannia elliptica Kunth – Peru, Ecuador, Colombia, and Venezuela
  - var. trichocarpa (Pamp.) Bernardi
- Weinmannia fagaroides Kunth – Costa Rica to Bolivia
  - var. trollii (O.C. Schmidt) Bernardi
- Weinmannia geometrica Rusby – Bolivia
- Weinmannia glabra L.f. – Mexico to Nicaragua; Ecuador and Peru
- Weinmannia glomerata C.Presl – Peru
- Weinmannia guyanensis Klotzsch ex Engl. – Guyana and southeastern Venezuela
- Weinmannia haenkeana Engl. – Ecuador, Peru, and Bolivia
- Weinmannia heterophylla Ruiz & Pav. – Venezuela, Colombia, Ecuador, Peru, and Bolivia
- Weinmannia horrida J.F.Morales – Costa Rica and Panama
- Weinmannia humilis Engl. – southeastern and southern Brazil
- Weinmannia ibaguensis Cuatrec. – Colombia
- Weinmannia ilutepuiensis P.E.Berry & J.Bradford – Venezuela
- Weinmannia intermedia Schltdl. & Cham. – southern Mexico and Honduras
- Weinmannia jahnii Cuatrec. – northwestern Venezuela
- Weinmannia jelskii Szyszył. – Ecuador and Peru
- Weinmannia karsteniana Szyszył. – Costa Rica, Panama, Colombia, and northwestern Venezuela
- Weinmannia kunthiana D.Don – Peru, Ecuador, Colombia, and northwestern Venezuela
- Weinmannia lansbergiana Engl. – Peru, northeastern Colombia, and Venezuela
- Weinmannia latifolia C.Presl – Colombia, Ecuador, and Peru
- Weinmannia laurina Kunth – Venezuela, Colombia, Panama, and Peru
- Weinmannia laxiramea Killip & A.C.Sm. – Guyana and southeastern Venezuela
- Weinmannia lechleriana Engl. – Bolivia, Peru, Colombia, and Venezuela
- Weinmannia lentiscifolia C.Presl – Bolivia, Peru, Ecuador, Colombia, and Venezuela
- Weinmannia lopezana Cuatrec. – Colombia
- Weinmannia loxensis Harling – Ecuador
- Weinmannia lyrata Rusby – Bolivia
- Weinmannia machupicchuensis F.Arroyo – Peru
- Weinmannia macrophylla Kunth – central Colombia and Ecuador
- Weinmannia magnifolia Cuatrec. – Colombia and Ecuador
- Weinmannia mariquitae Szyszył. – Colombia and Ecuador
- Weinmannia mauritiana D.Don – Mauritius and Réunion
- Weinmannia microphylla Ruiz & Pav. – Venezuela, Peru, and Colombia
  - var. tenuior (Diels) J.F. Macbr.
- Weinmannia multijuga Killip & A.C.Sm. – Bolivia, Peru, Ecuador, Colombia, and Venezuela
- Weinmannia organensis Gardner – Peru and southeastern and southern Brazil
- Weinmannia ovata Cav. – Bolivia, Peru, Ecuador, Colombia, and Venezuela
- Weinmannia oxapampana F.Arroyo – Peru
- Weinmannia parvifoliolata Cuatrec. – Colombia
- Weinmannia paulliniifolia Pohl ex Ser. – southeastern and southern Brazil
- Weinmannia pentaphylla Ruiz & Pav. – Peru
- Weinmannia pinnata L. – Caribbean, Central America, Andes, and Brazil
- Weinmannia piurensis O.C.Schmidt – Peru
- Weinmannia polyphylla Moric. ex DC. – Costa Rica, Colombia, Ecuador, Peru, and Bolivia
- Weinmannia portlandiana R.A. Howard & Proctor – Jamaica
- Weinmannia pubescens Kunth – Peru, Ecuador, Colombia, and Venezuela
  - var. arcabucoana (Cuatrec.) Bernardi
  - var. popayanensis (Hieron.) Killip & A.C. Sm.
- Weinmannia reticulata Ruiz & Pav. – Bolivia, Peru, Ecuador, and Colombia
- Weinmannia rhoifolia Rusby – Bolivia
- Weinmannia rollottii Killip – Andes of Colombia and Ecuador
  - var. subvelutina (Cuatrec.) Bernardi
- Weinmannia sorbifolia Kunth – Peru, Ecuador, Colombia, and Venezuela
  - var. caliana (Cuatrec.) Cuatrec.
  - var. sclerophylla (Cuatrec.) Cuatrec.
- Weinmannia spruceana Engl. – Bolivia, Peru, Ecuador, Colombia, and Venezuela
- Weinmannia stenocarpa Killip & A.C. Sm. – Ecuador
- Weinmannia subsessiliflora Ruiz & Pav. – Colombia, Peru, and west-central Brazil
  - var. caquetana (Cuatrec.) Bernardi
- Weinmannia ternata Engl. – Peru
- Weinmannia testudineata Cuatrec. – northeastern Colombia and northwestern Venezuela
- Weinmannia tinctoria Sm. – Mascarene Islands
- Weinmannia tolimensis Cuatrec. – Colombia
- Weinmannia tomentosa L.f. – Colombia and northwestern Venezuela
- Weinmannia trianae Wedd. – Costa Rica, Colombia, Ecuador, Peru, and Bolivia
- Weinmannia trichosperma Cav. – Argentina and Chile
- Weinmannia ulei Diels – Northern Peru
- Weinmannia vegasana Killip & A.C.Sm. – Colombia
- Weinmannia velutina O.C.Schmidt – Peru, Venezuela, Guyana, and northern Brazil
- Weinmannia vulcanicola J.F.Morales – Costa Rica
- Weinmannia wercklei Standl. – Costa Rica and Panama
- Weinmannia yungasensis A.Fuentes & Z.S.Rogers – Bolivia

=== Unplaced names ===
- Weinmannia spiraeoides A.Gray

== Taxonomy ==
Until recently the genus included five sections:

- Fasciculata (mostly Malesia, from Sumatra to Fiji)
- Inspersa (Madagascar)
- Leiospermum (mostly Pacific, from Bismarck archipelago to the Marquesas)
- Spicata (Madagascar and Comores)
- Weinmannia (Central and South America, Mascarenes)

A phylogenomic study by Pillon et al. (2021) concluded that Weinmannia was paraphyletic, and formed two distinct clades. The species belonging to the four Old World sections – Fasciculatae, Inspersae, Spicatae, and Leiospermum – formed a monophyletic group, which is sister to the Old World (mostly New Caledonian) genera Cunonia and Pancheria. Section Weinmannia, which includes species from the Americas and the Mascarene Islands, is sister to the Old World assemblage. They proposed placing the four Old World sections into the revived genus Pterophylla, with genus Weinmannia limited to the American and Mascarene species in section Weinmannia.
