= Weinmannia portlandiana =

Conservation status
- Vulnerable (IUCN 2.3)

Scientific classification
- Kingdom: Plantae
- Clade: Tracheophytes
- Clade: Angiosperms
- Clade: Eudicots
- Clade: Rosids
- Order: Oxalidales
- Family: Cunoniaceae
- Genus: Weinmannia
- Species: W. portlandiana

Binomial name
- Weinmannia portlandiana Howard & Proctor

Species of tree

Weinmannia portlandiana is a species of plant in the family Cunoniaceae. It is endemic to Jamaica. It is threatened by habitat loss.
