= East Asian tea ceremony =

Ritualized form of making tea

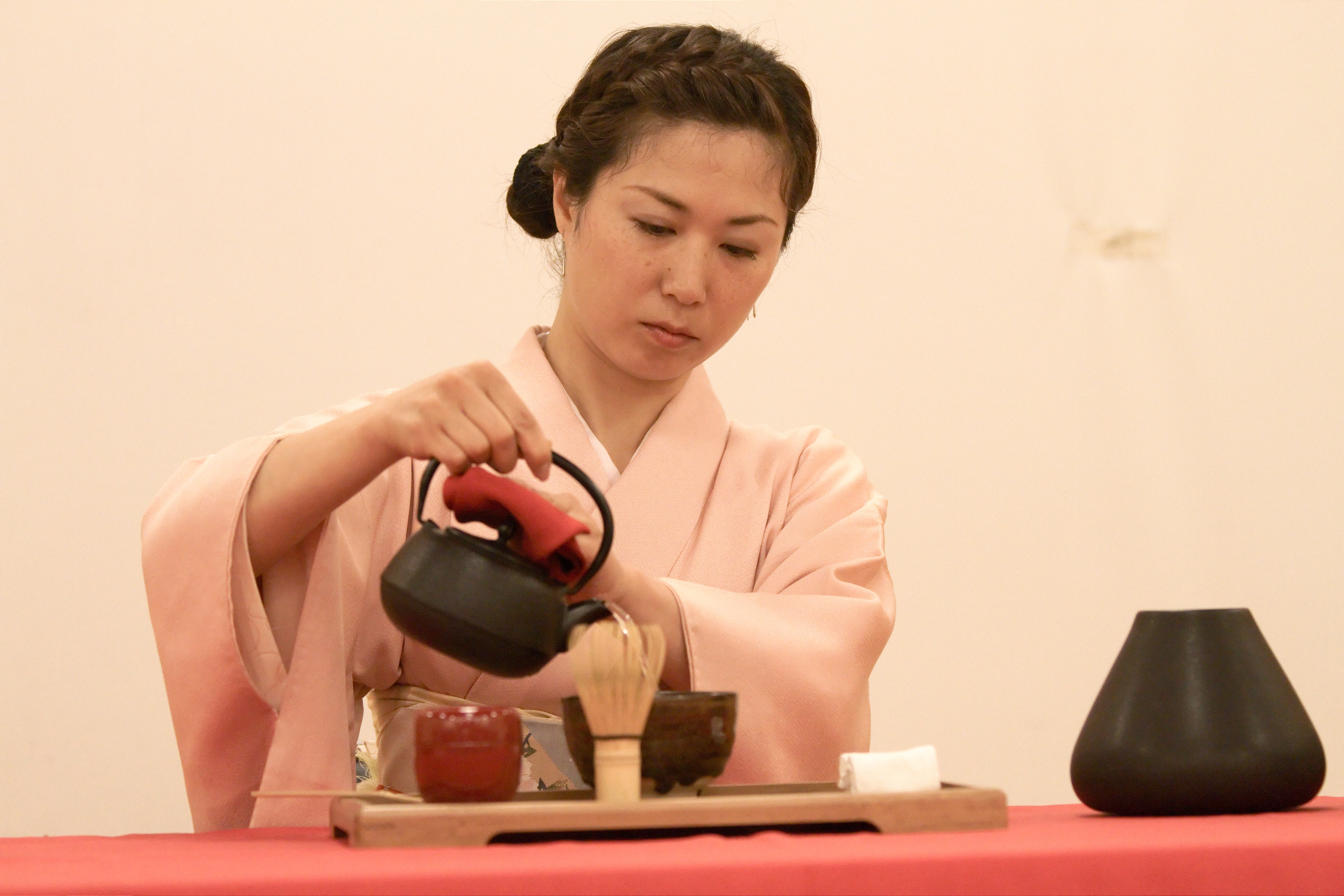
- A Japanese hostess performs a tea ceremony.

Chinese name
- Chinese: 茶道
Transcriptions
Standard Mandarin
- Hanyu Pinyin: Chádào

Alternative Chinese name
- Traditional Chinese: 茶藝
- Simplified Chinese: 茶艺
Transcriptions
Standard Mandarin
- Hanyu Pinyin: Cháyì

Second alternative Chinese name
- Traditional Chinese: 茶禮
- Simplified Chinese: 茶礼
Transcriptions
Standard Mandarin
- Hanyu Pinyin: Chálǐ

Vietnamese name
- Vietnamese alphabet: trà đạo
- Chữ Hán: 茶道

Korean name
- Hangul: 다도
- Hanja: 茶道
Transcriptions
- Revised Romanization: Dado

Alternative Korean name
- Hangul: 다례
- Hanja: 茶禮
Transcriptions
- Revised Romanization: Darye

Japanese name
- Kanji: 茶道
Transcriptions
- Romanization: Sadō/Chadō

Tea ceremony is a ritualized practice of making and serving tea (茶 cha) in East Asia practiced in the Sinosphere. The original term from China (Chinese: 茶道 or 茶禮 or 茶艺), literally translated as either "way of tea", "etiquette for tea or tea rite", or "art of tea" among the languages in the Sinosphere, is a cultural activity involving the ceremonial preparation and presentation of tea. Korean, Vietnamese and Japanese tea culture were inspired by the Chinese tea culture during ancient and medieval times, particularly after the successful transplant of the tea plant from Tang China to Korea, Vietnam and Japan by traveling Buddhist monks and scholars in 8th century and onwards.

One can also refer to the whole set of rituals, tools, gestures, etc. used in such ceremonies as tea culture. All of these tea ceremonies and rituals contain "an adoration of the beautiful among the sordid facts of everyday life", as well as refinement, an inner spiritual content, humility, restraint and simplicity "as all arts that partake the extraordinary, an artistic artificiality, abstractness, symbolism and formalism" to one degree or another.

At the very rudimentary level, East Asian tea ceremonies are a formalized way of making tea, in a process that has been refined to yield the best taste. Historical classics on the subject include the 8th-century Chinese monograph The Classic of Tea (茶经 Chájīng) and the 12th-century Chinese book Treatise on Tea (大观茶论 Dàguān Chálùn).

== In East Asia ==
=== China ===
In China, a tea house (茶室 cháshì, 茶館 cháguăn or 茶屋 cháwū) is traditionally similar to a coffeehouse, albeit offering tea rather than coffee. People gather at tea houses to chat, socialize, play xiangqi or Go (weiqi), and enjoy tea, and young people often meet at tea houses for dates. Tea ceremonies are often performed during business meetings.

=== Japan ===
In Japanese tradition a tea house ordinarily refers to a private structure called a chashitsu (茶室) designed for holding Japanese tea ceremonies. This structure and specifically the room in it where the tea ceremony takes place is called chashitsu (茶室; literally "tea room") with its entrance called a roji (露地). The architectural space called chashitsu was created for aesthetic and intellectual fulfillment. In Japan, a tea ceremony is a blend of two principles, sabi (寂) and wabi (侘). "Wabi" represents the inner, or spiritual, experiences of human lives. Its original meaning indicated quiet or sober refinement, or subdued taste "characterized by humility, restraint, simplicity, naturalism, profundity, imperfection, and asymmetry" and "emphasizes simple, unadorned objects and architectural space, and celebrates the mellow beauty that time and care to impart to materials." "Sabi," on the other hand, represents the outer, or material imperfection of life, also the original nature of things. Zen Buddhism has been an influence in the development of the tea ceremony. The elements of the Japanese tea ceremony are the harmony of nature and self-cultivation and enjoying tea in a formal and informal setting. The Japanese tea ceremony developed as a "transformative practice", and began to evolve its own aesthetic, in particular, that of "sabis" and "wabis" principles. Understanding emptiness was considered the most effective means to spiritual awakening while embracing imperfection was honored as a healthy reminder to cherish our unpolished selves, here and now, just as we are – the first step to "Satori" or Enlightenment. Tea drinking is used as an aid to meditation, for assistance in fortune telling, for ceremonial purposes and in the expression of the arts.

The Japanese tea garden was created during the Muromachi period (1333–1573) and Momoyama period (1573–1600) as a setting for the Japanese tea ceremony, or chadō (茶道). The style of the garden takes its name from the roji, or path to the teahouse, which is supposed to inspire the visitor to meditate to prepare him for the ceremony. There is an outer garden, with a gate and covered arbor where guests wait for the invitation to enter. They then pass through a gate to the inner garden, where they wash their hands and rinse their mouth, as they would before entering a Shinto shrine, before going into the teahouse itself. The path is always kept moist and green, so it will look like a remote mountain path, and there are no bright flowers that might distract the visitor from his meditation. Early tea houses had no windows, but later teahouses have a wall that can be opened for a view of the garden.

=== Korea ===
In Korea, the traditional Korean tea ceremony or Darye (다례; 茶禮), which is central to the Korean approach to tea, developed as Koreans cultivated, refined, and drank tea for thousands of years. The oldest surviving official record dates back to 8th century detailing Shilla and Gaya Confederacy monarchs and royal families holding tea ceremonies at palaces and temples. The practice continued and flourished during Goryeo and was refined during the Joseon dynasty.

However, by the middle of the Joseon dynasty, there appears to have been a decline in tea drinking except for the anniversary ceremonies. It is said, that when the Ming Commander, Yang Hao, told King Seonjo (r.1567-1601) during the Japanese invasion that he had discovered high-quality tea plants in Korea, and that "if you were to sell the tea in Liaodong, you could get a silver coin for every ten pounds of tea. Altogether, that would be enough silver to buy ten thousand horses." King Seonjo, however, replied "We do not have a tea drinking custom in our country."

Tea was reintroduced to Korea by the Japanese in 1890s, the same time coffee was introduced. The first tea house, called "Dabang," 다방, was established in the Sontag Hotel in Seoul, in 1902. The Dabang culture grew, spreading throughout Korea throughout the Japanese Occupation, and continuing to this day. From 1930s to 1980s, the Ssanghwa tea (쌍화차 雙和茶) was the most popular item in the Dabang culture. Not actually containing any tea extracts, it was a sweetened herbal tea. The second most popular tea served was the Hongcha (홍차) or western Black Tea. There was no ceremonial aspect in drinking these teas in Dabang.

=== Gallery ===
East Asian Teahouses

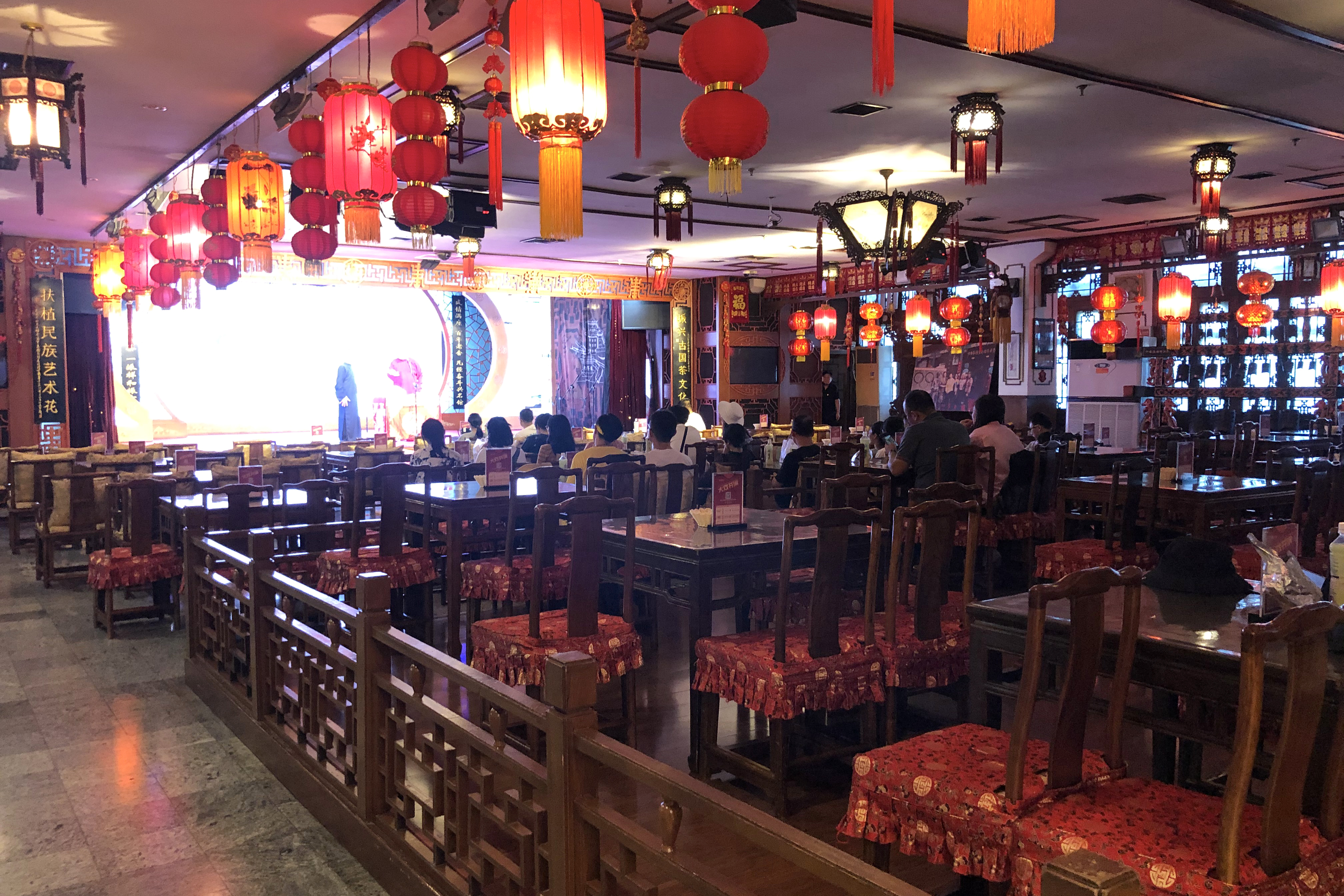
Interior of the Lao She Teahouse in Beijing, China

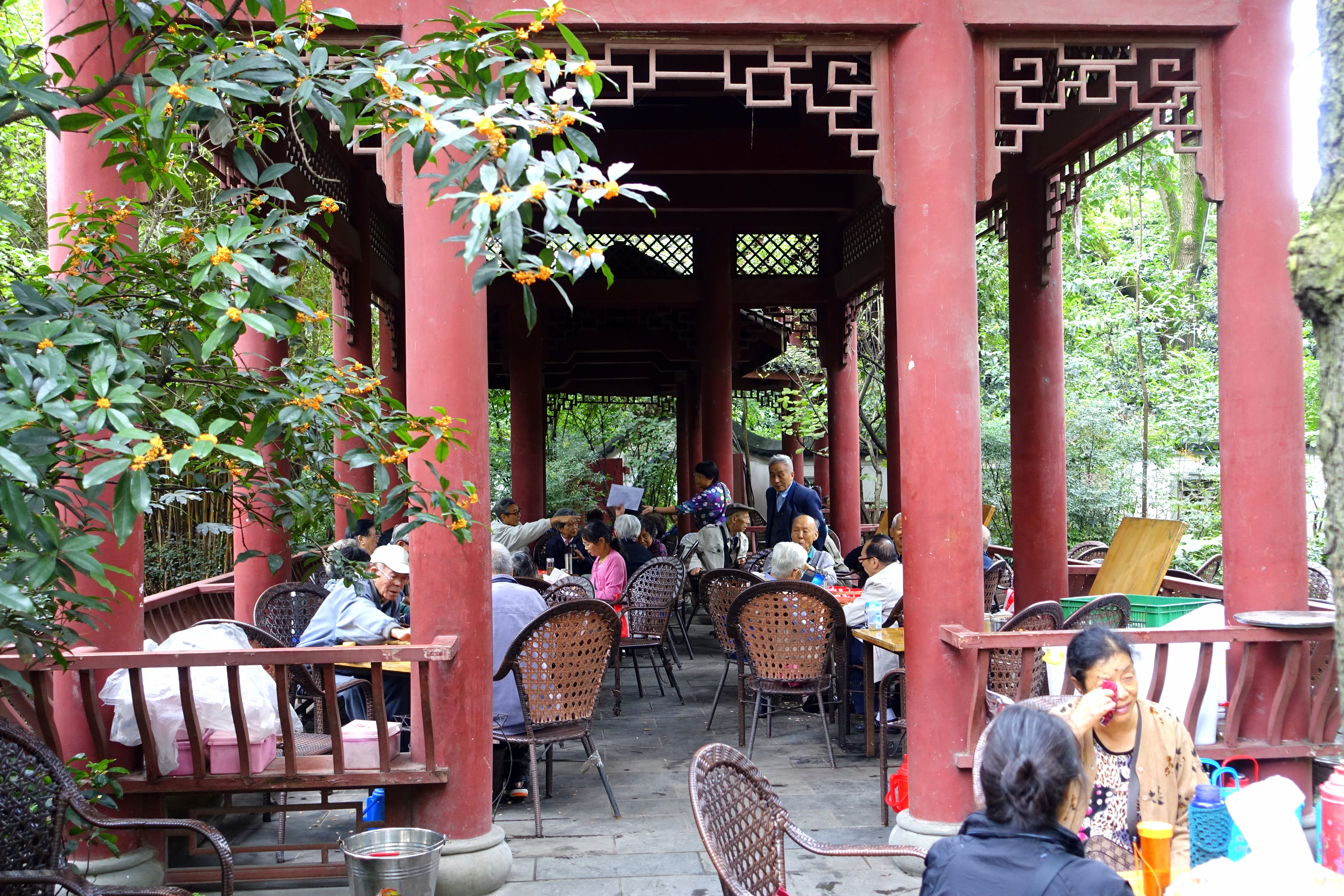
A Chinese teahouse in Baihuatan Park, Chengdu, Sichuan, China

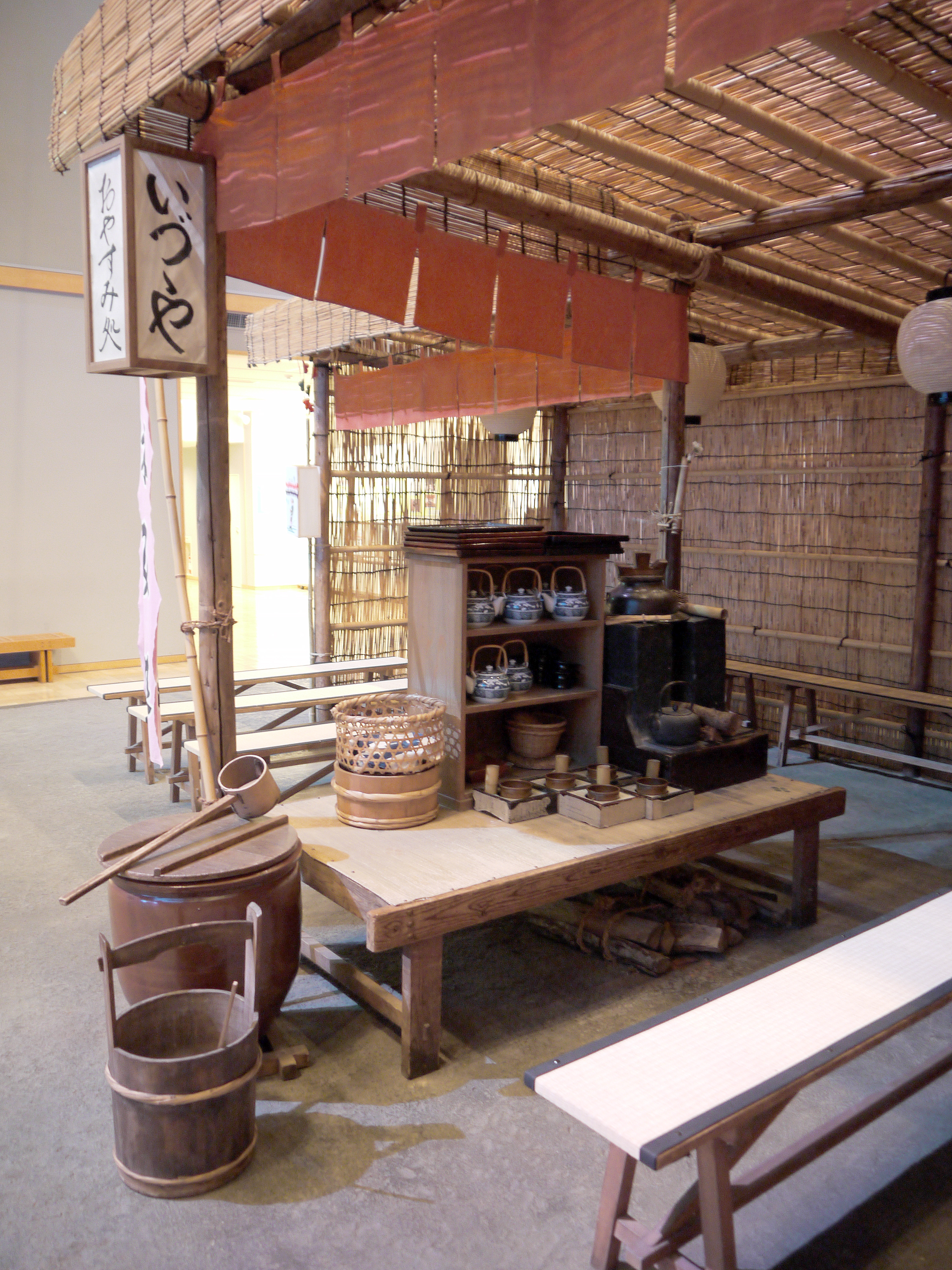
A Japanese teahouse dating back to the Edo period

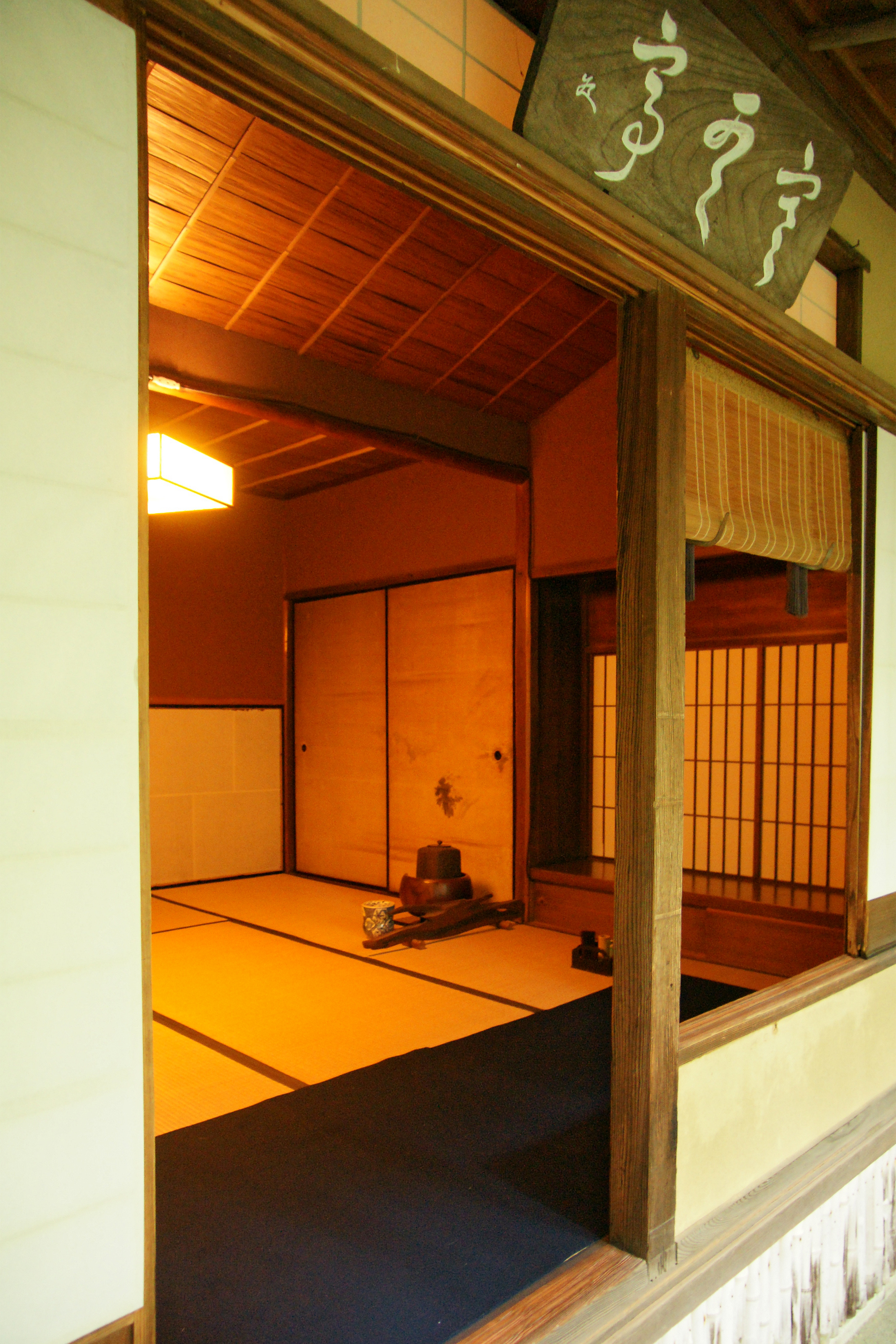
Gyokusenen in Kanazawa, Ishikawa prefecture, Japan

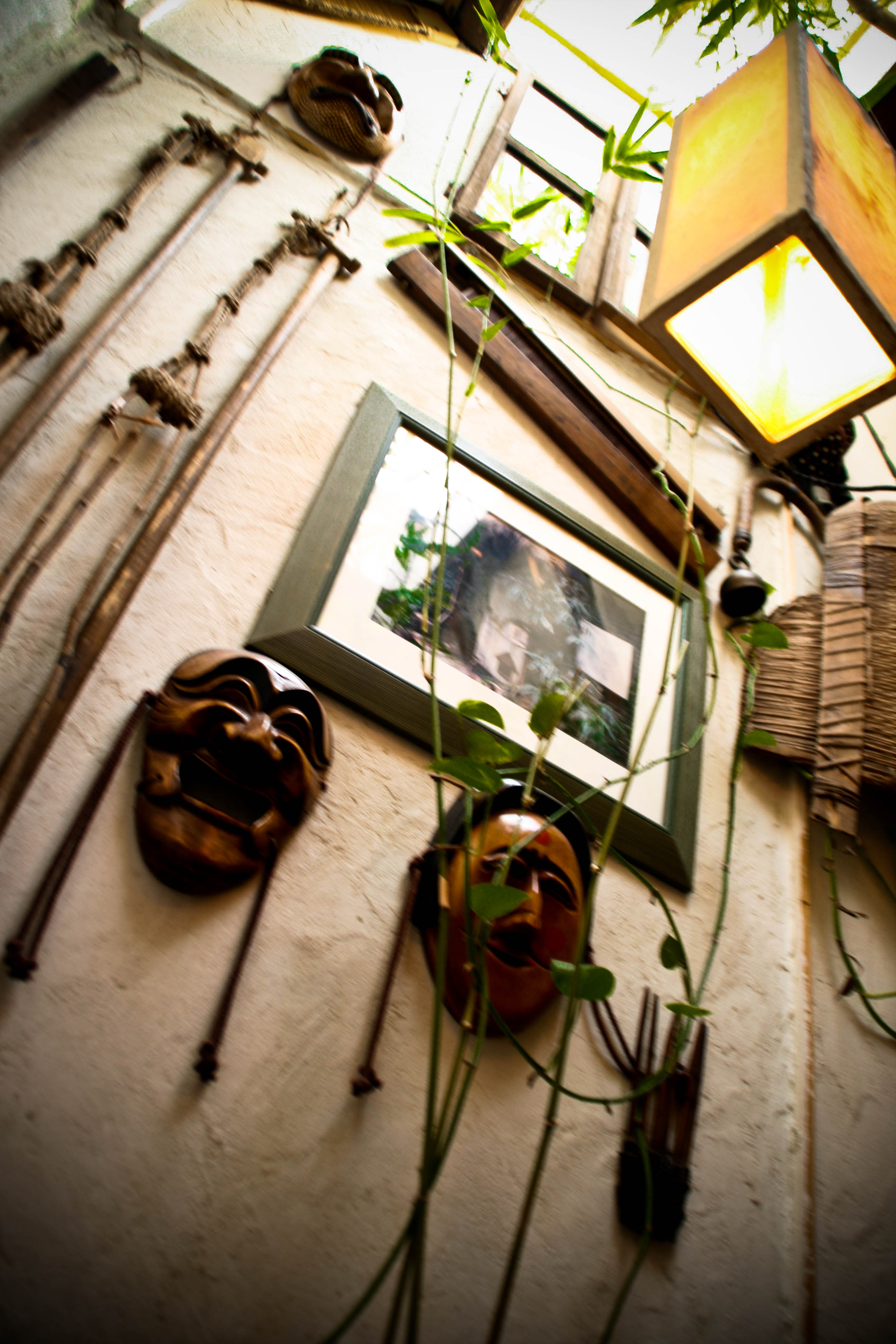
Interior of a Korean teahouse in Angang, Gyeongju, Gyeongbuk, South Korea

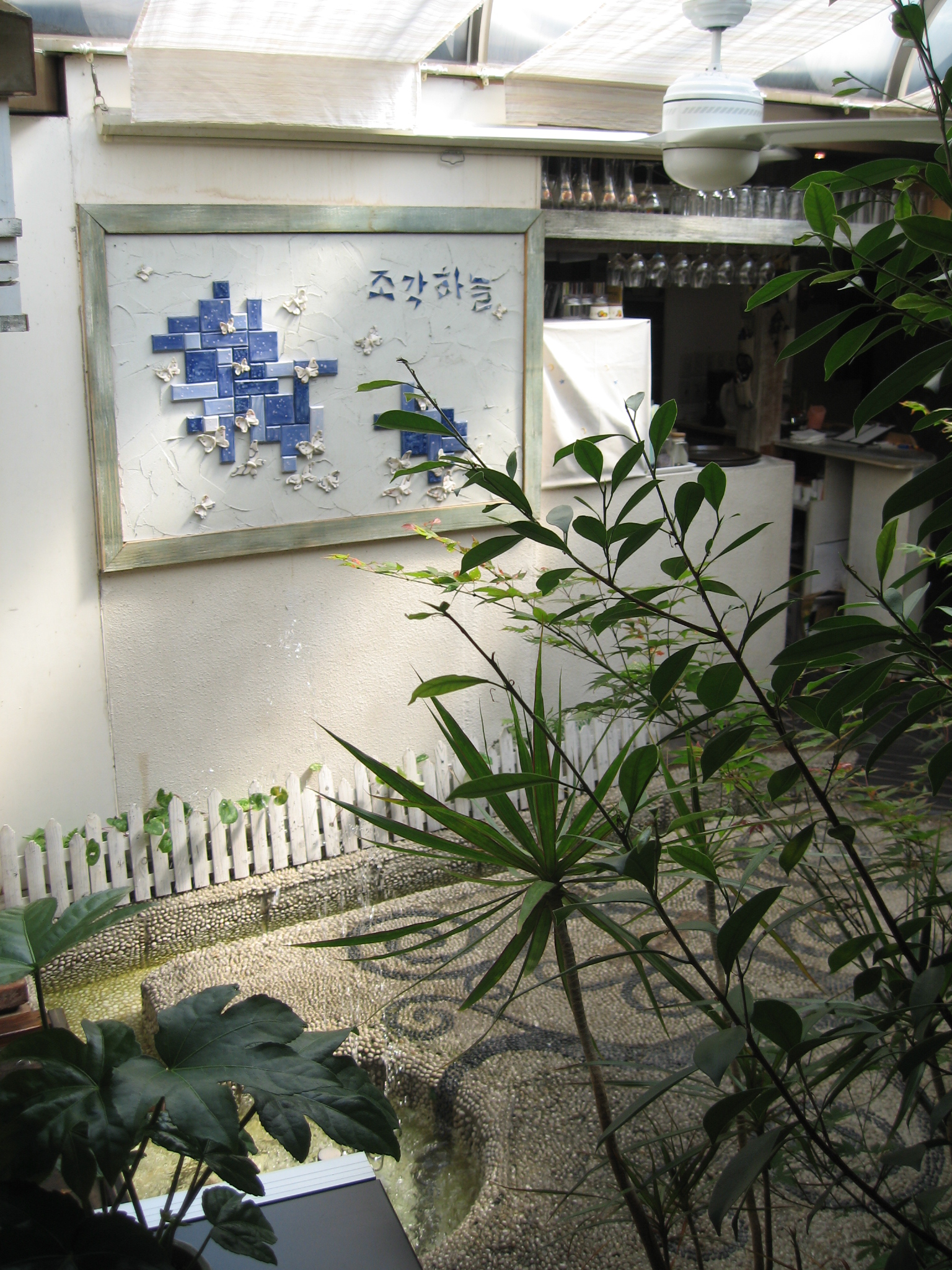
Interior of a Korean teahouse in Insadong, Seoul, South Korea

== Outside East Asia ==
Corresponding tea-drinking habits can be found worldwide. In the United Kingdom, including the Victorian-era afternoon tea or tea party ritual, was a social event, where the ritual of being seen to have the right equipment, manners, and social circle, was just as important as the drink itself. The Victorian-era tea was also influenced by the Indian tea culture, as for the choice of tea varieties.

In the United States, American tea culture has roots that trace back to the Dutch colonization of the Americas. In the colonies, teas were served with silver strainers, fine porcelain cups and pots and exquisite tea caddies. In recent years there has been a resurgence of interest in fine teas in the United States, mainly due to the lifting of China's ban on exports in 1971. From the 1920s to 1971, Americans could not get much Chinese tea, and very little Indian tea was imported.
