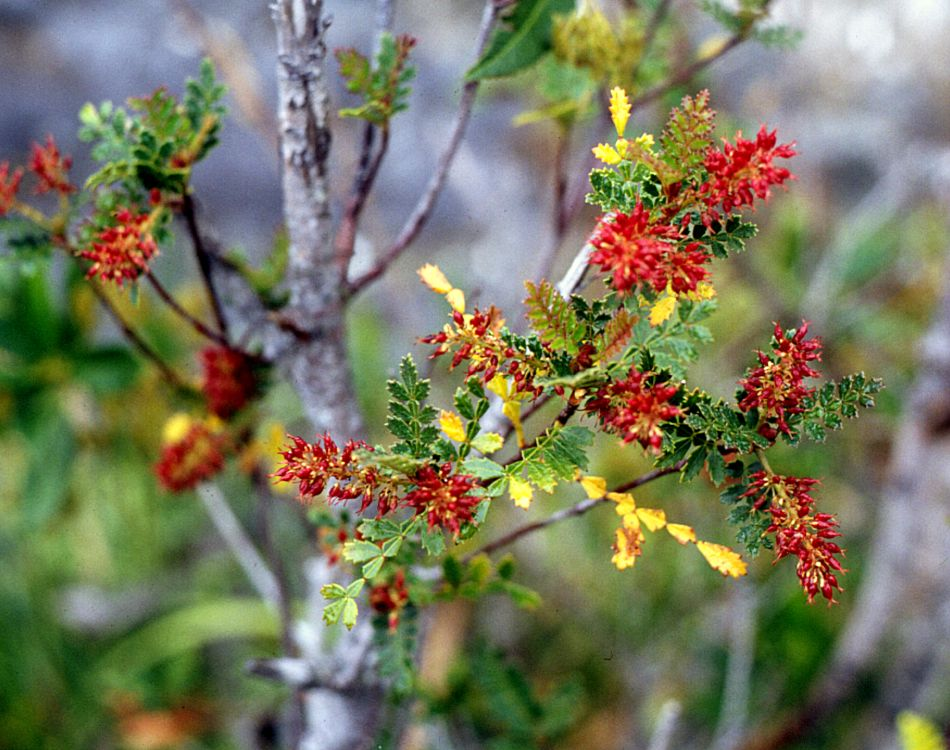

Conservation status
- Least Concern (IUCN 3.1)

Scientific classification
- Kingdom: Plantae
- Clade: Tracheophytes
- Clade: Angiosperms
- Clade: Eudicots
- Clade: Rosids
- Order: Oxalidales
- Family: Cunoniaceae
- Genus: Weinmannia
- Species: W. trichosperma

Binomial name
- Weinmannia trichosperma Cav.

= Weinmannia trichosperma =

Tineo

Species of plant

Weinmannia trichosperma, the tineo, is an evergreen flowering tree in the family of Cunoniaceae, it is native to Chile and Argentina: 35 to 47°S. endemic to laurel forest habitat.

== Description ==
Weinmannia trichosperma grows up to 30 m (100 ft) high. It has a straight trunk up to 1 m (3 ft) in diameter and gray, fissured bark. The leaves are imparipinnate and opposite. Between the leaflets there are triangular wings giving each pair a rhomboid outline. There are two deciduous stipules at the base of the leaves. The leaves are about 3–8 cm long and 2–4 cm wide, and the leaflets are 0.6–1.6 cm long and 0.6–1.0 cm wide and toothed. The foliage tends to be sparse and spread out.

The flowers are hermaphrodite, small, white and clustered in racemes. The calyx is made up of 4–5 imbricate sepals; the corolla has 3–5 composite petals; the androecium has 8-10 stamens; the gynoecium has a superior ovary with 2 carpels and white stigmas.

The fruit is a leathery obovate capsule which is divided in two. In autumn the capsule turns bright red, and is 6–9 mm long and 2 mm wide. It opens in the middle between the styles. The seeds are ellipsoid, light brown, with scattered white hairs and small: 1 mm long and 0.6 mm wide.

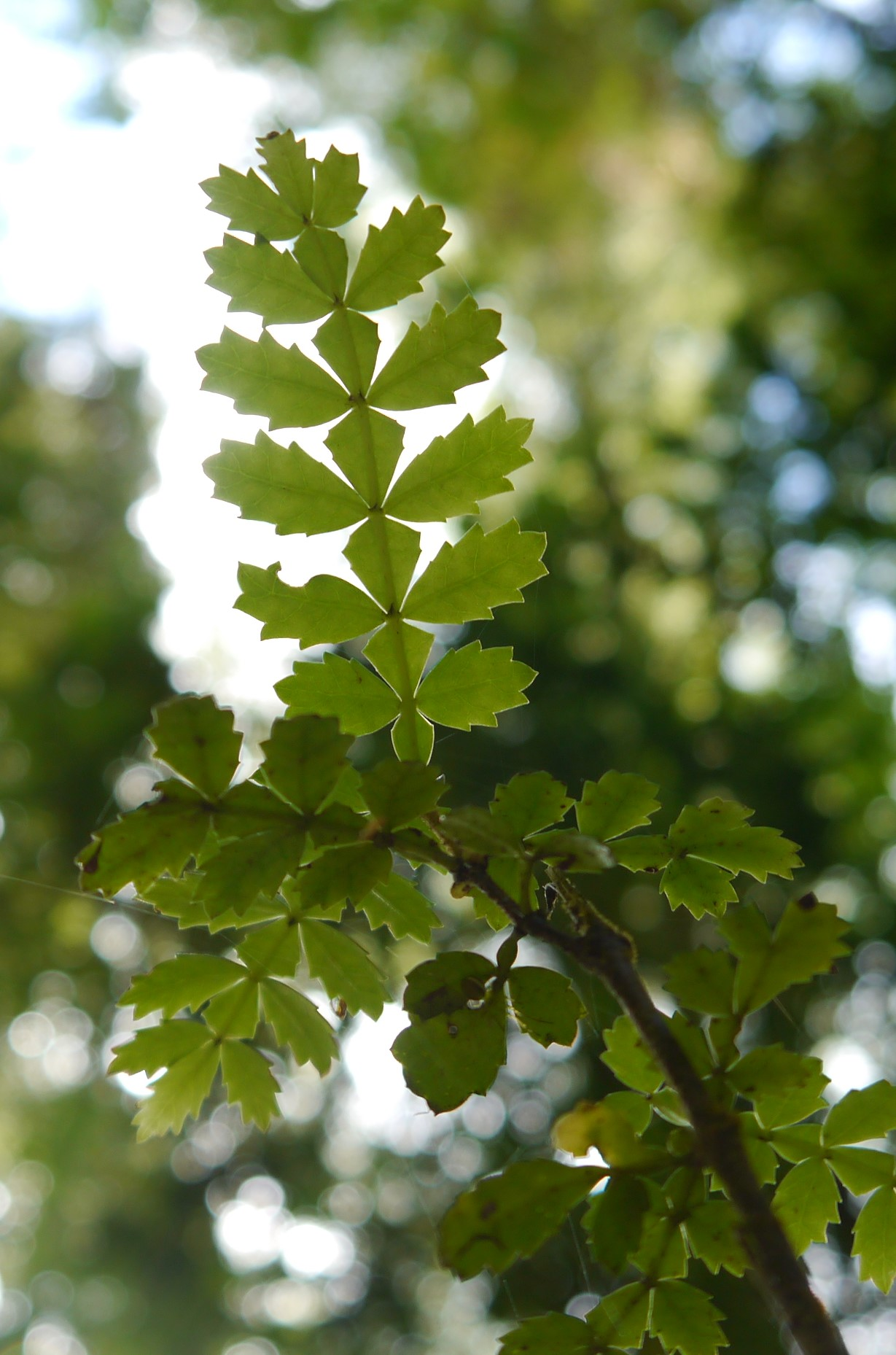
Detail of the leaves

== Cultivation and uses ==
The bark can be used to tan leather. W. trichosperma is used as an ornamental tree in Chile. The flowers are used by introduced European bees to make a delicious honey. The wood is hard and exhibits a vivid grain pattern of darker and lighter colouration, making it highly prized for decorative uses. It thrives in cool and moist climates, and it succeeds as an ornamental in Northern Ireland, Scotland, some parts of England and in the North Pacific Coast of the United States.

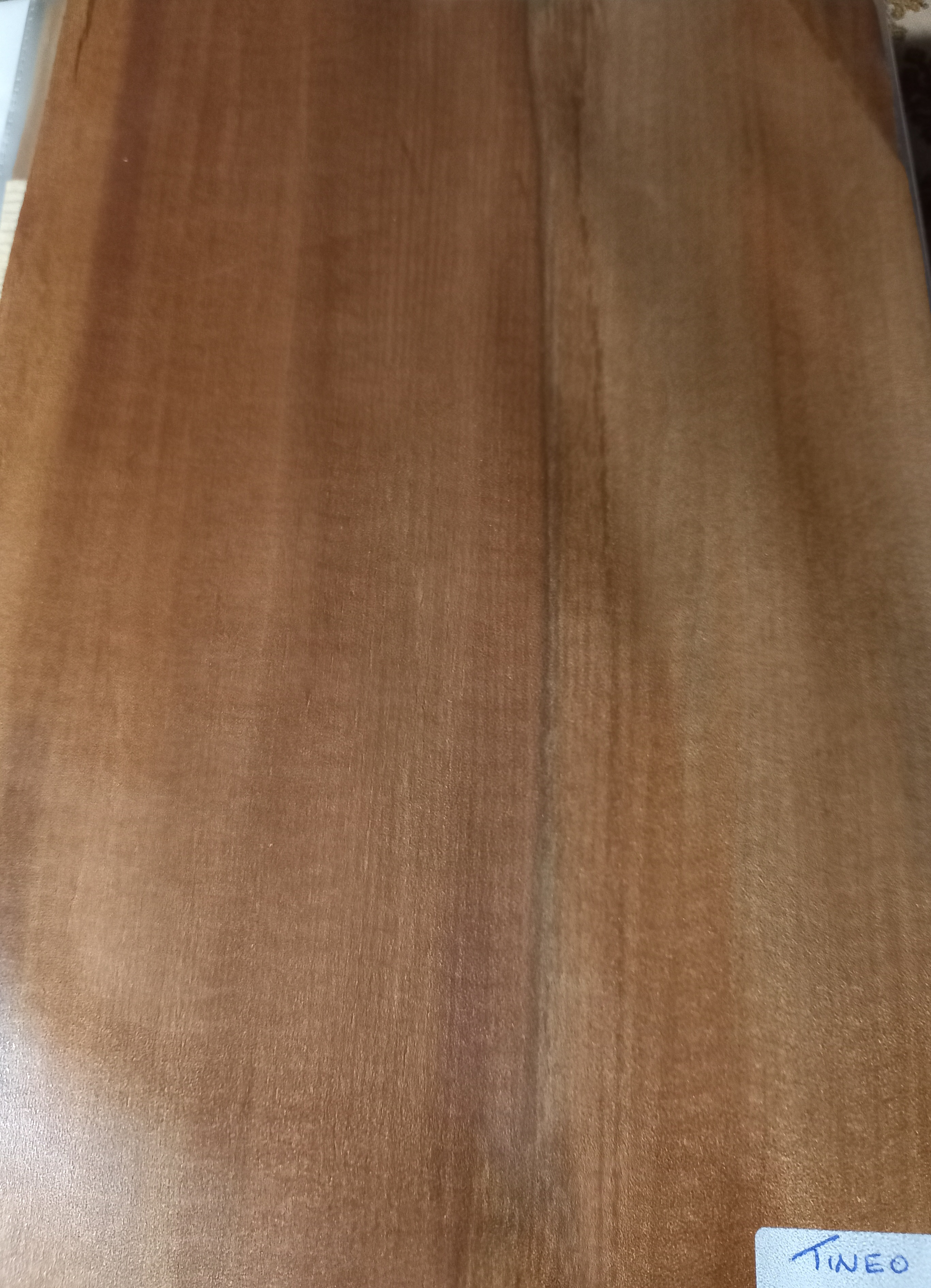
Tineo veneer

== Veneers ==
Weinmannia trichosperma species gives a valuable veneer, called Tineo in the Latin American trade. It is valued as a decorative veneer for its warm reddish-brown to pinkish tones, often accompanied by a fine, uniform texture and a generally straight to slightly interlocked grain. When sliced into veneer, Tineo can show a calm, elegant figure with a natural satin-like sheen, making it well suited for refined interior applications such as wall paneling, cabinetry, furniture, and architectural joinery where a subtle but rich aesthetic is desired.

== Etymology ==
Weinmannia, for German botanist J. A. Weinmann (1782–1858); trichosperma, from Latin: hairy seeds. And tineo, Mapuche name.

== References and external links ==
- Donoso, C. 2005. Árboles nativos de Chile. Guía de reconocimiento. Edición 4. Marisa Cuneo Ediciones, Valdivia, Chile. 136 p.
- Hoffmann, A. 1982. Flora silvestre de Chile, Zona Araucana. Edición 4. Fundación Claudio Gay, Santiago. 258 p.
- "Weinmannia trichosperma". Enciclopedia de la Flora Chilena.
- "Weinmannia trichosperma in Scotland". Dendrological Plant Image Gallery.
- "Weinmannia trichosperma in Washington Park Arboretum" (PDF). Washington Park Arboretum. Archived from the original (PDF) on 2009-03-24.
