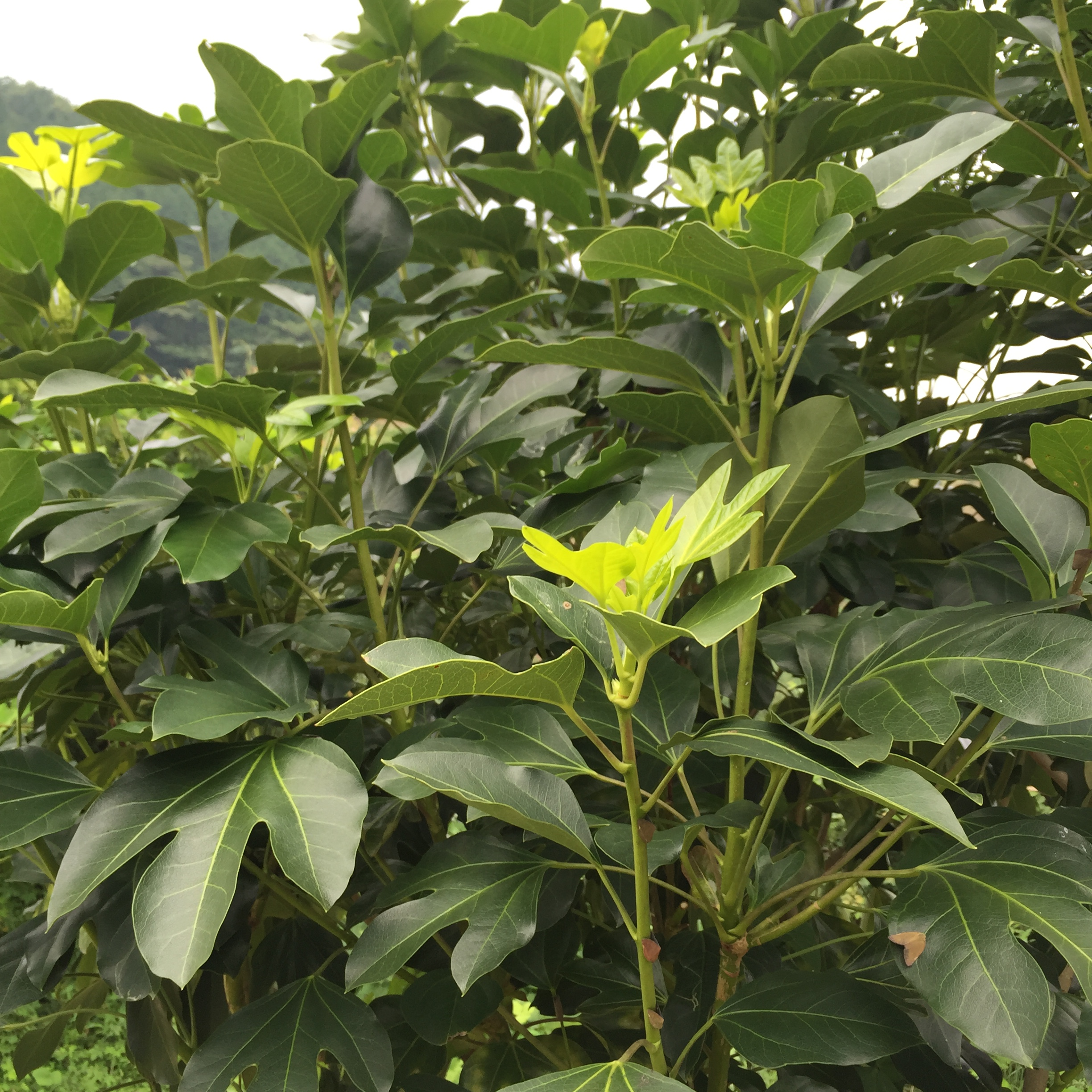
- Dendropanax morbiferus at Suncheon in South Korea(2016-08-02)

Scientific classification
- Kingdom: Plantae
- Clade: Tracheophytes
- Clade: Angiosperms
- Clade: Eudicots
- Clade: Asterids
- Order: Apiales
- Family: Araliaceae
- Genus: Dendropanax
- Species: D. morbiferus

Binomial name
- Dendropanax morbiferus H.Lév.

= Dendropanax morbiferus =

Species of flowering plant

Dendropanax morbiferus, also called Korean dendropanax, is a shrub native to the Korean peninsula, which belongs to the family Araliaceae.
