= Weinmannia ulei =

Conservation status
- Vulnerable (IUCN 2.3)

Scientific classification
- Kingdom: Plantae
- Clade: Embryophytes
- Clade: Tracheophytes
- Clade: Angiosperms
- Clade: Eudicots
- Clade: Rosids
- Order: Oxalidales
- Family: Cunoniaceae
- Genus: Weinmannia
- Species: W. ulei

Binomial name
- Weinmannia ulei Diels

Species of plant

Weinmannia ulei is a species of flowering plant in the family Cunoniaceae. It is a tree endemic to Peru.
