= Weinmannia descendens =

Conservation status
- Vulnerable (IUCN 2.3)

Scientific classification
- Kingdom: Plantae
- Clade: Tracheophytes
- Clade: Angiosperms
- Clade: Eudicots
- Clade: Rosids
- Order: Oxalidales
- Family: Cunoniaceae
- Genus: Weinmannia
- Species: W. descendens

Binomial name
- Weinmannia descendens Diels

Species of plant

Weinmannia descendens is a species of plant in the family Cunoniaceae. It is endemic to Peru.
