= Weinmannia jelskii =

Conservation status
- Least Concern (IUCN 3.1)

Scientific classification
- Kingdom: Plantae
- Clade: Tracheophytes
- Clade: Angiosperms
- Clade: Eudicots
- Clade: Rosids
- Order: Oxalidales
- Family: Cunoniaceae
- Genus: Weinmannia
- Species: W. jelskii

Binomial name
- Weinmannia jelskii Szyszył.

Synonyms
- Weinmannia cutervensis Cuatrec.; Weinmannia ovalis f. equatoriensis Pamp.

Species of plant

Weinmannia jelskii is a species of flowering plant in the family Cunoniaceae. It is a tree native to Ecuador, Peru, and northwestern Venezuela. It is a tree which grows up to 6 metres tall, which inhabits moist montane forests, including cloud forests, and montane shrubland from 2,000 to 3,000 metres elevation.

In Ecuador it is present in Loja, Morona-Santiago, and Zamora-Chinchipe provinces from 2,000 to 2,500 metres elevation. In Peru it is present in Cajamarca, Junín, and Pasco departments from 2,500 to 3,000 metres elevation. In Venezuela it is known only from Trujillo State from 2,600 to 3,000 metres elevation.

The species was described by Ignaz von Szyszyłowicz in 1894.
