= Roji =

Formal Japanese tea house garden

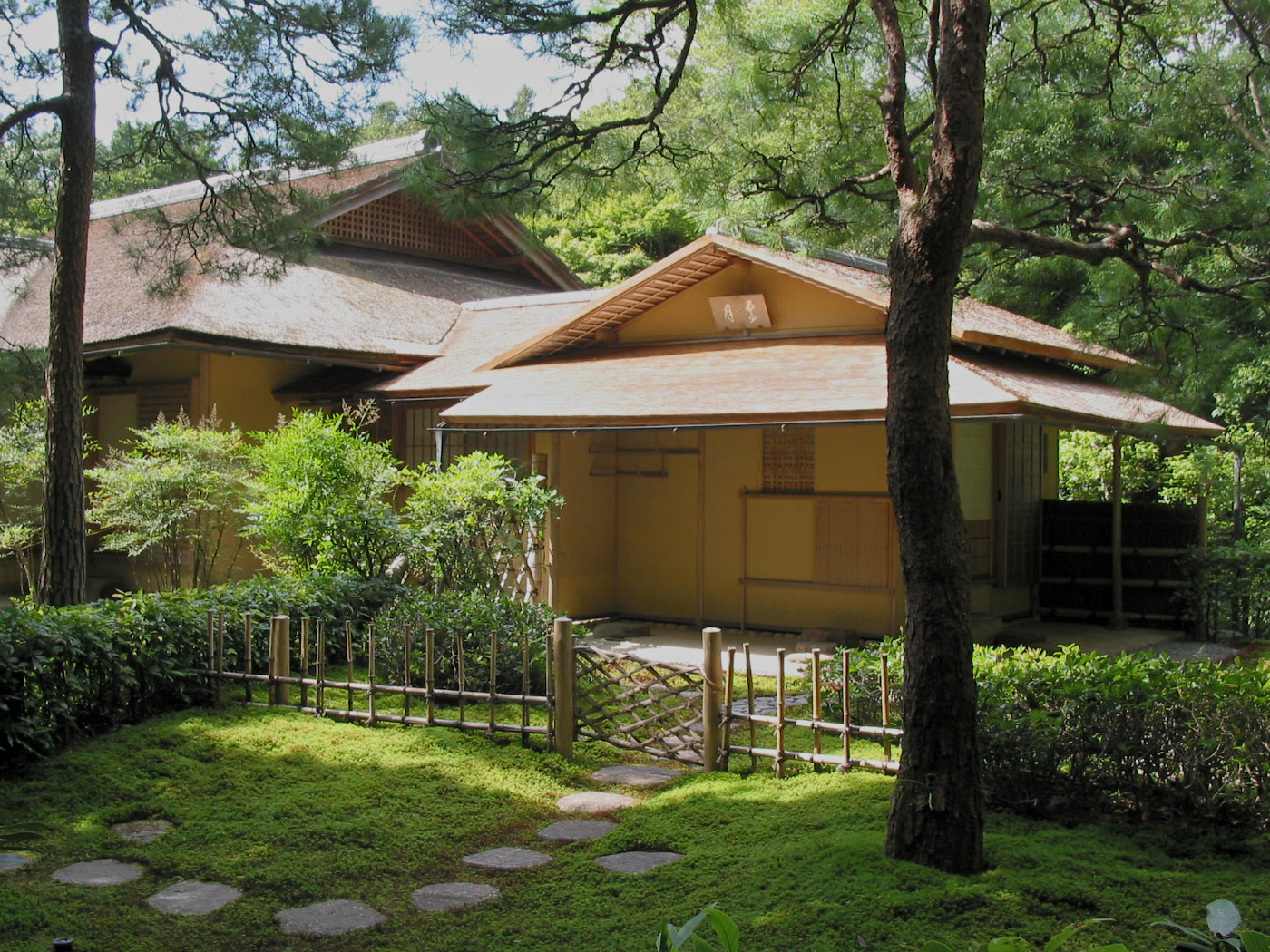
Roji leading to the Seigetsu chashitsu at Ise Jingū; typical features include the stepping stones, moss, bamboo gate, and division into outer and inner gardens

Roji (露地), lit. 'dewy ground', is the Japanese term used for the garden through which one passes to the chashitsu for the tea ceremony. The roji acts as a transitional space leading from the entry gate to the teahouse, and generally cultivates an air of simplicity and purification.

== Development ==
The roji developed during the Momoyama era (1573–1603) as the tea ceremony established itself in Japan. Sen no Rikyū was important in the development of the roji. At his tea house Tai-an, the 'sleeve-brushing pine' gained its name from the garden's diminutive size. For his tea house at Sakai, he planted hedges to obscure the view over the Inland Sea, and only when a guest bent over the tsukubai would they see the view. Rikyū explained his design by quoting a verse by Sōgi: "A glimpse of the sea through the trees, and the flash of the stream at my feet." Kobori Enshū was also a leading practitioner.

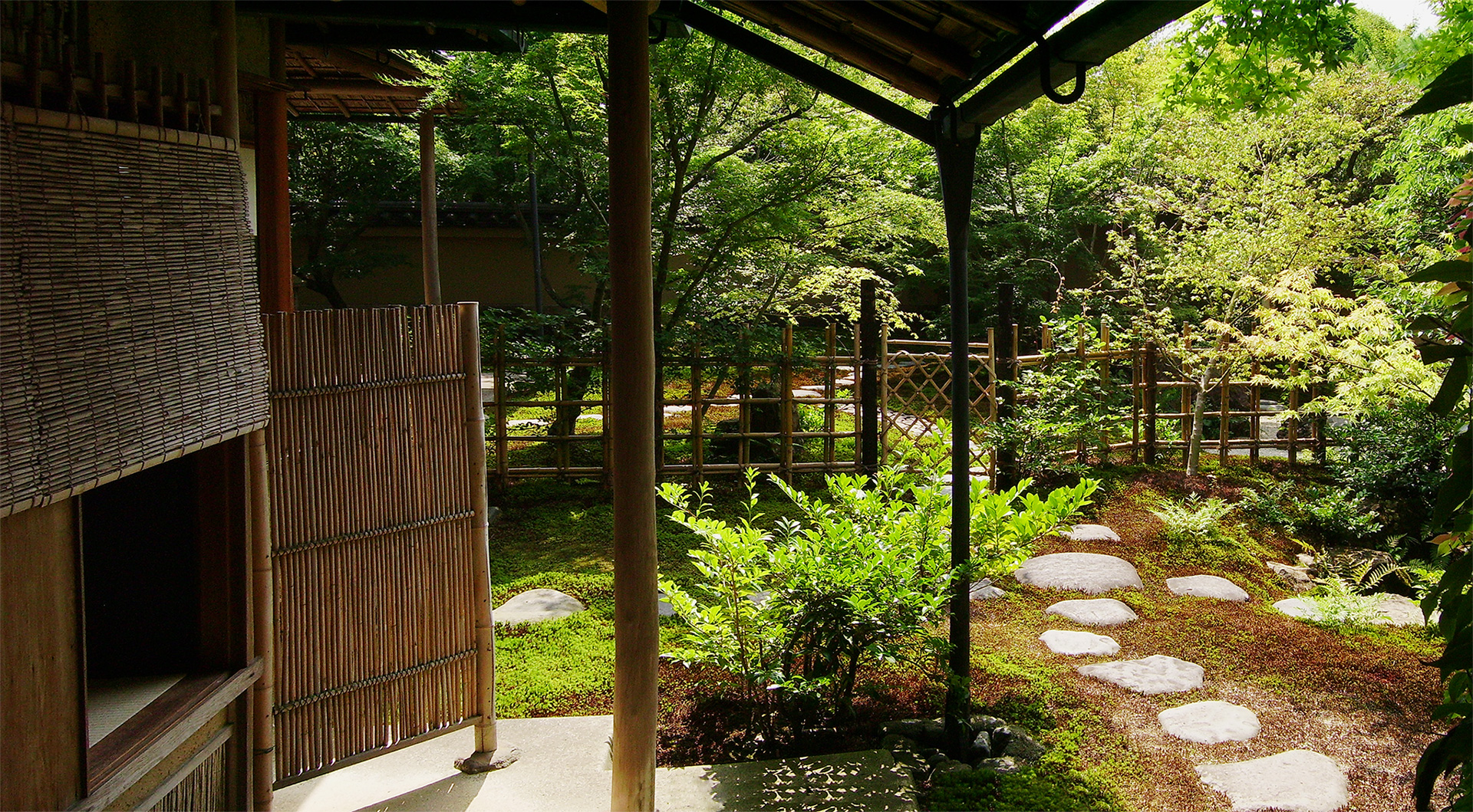
Roji with the Nijiriguchi (Entrance) to the tea house at the Adachi Museum of Art, Yasugi, Shimane Prefecture, Japan.

== Features ==
The roji is usually divided into an outer and inner garden, with a machiai (waiting arbour). Use of stone as both a decorative and a functional feature is characteristic of the roji. Typical features include the tsukubai (ablution basin), tōrō (lantern), tobi ishi (stepping stones), and wicket gate. Ostentatious plantings are generally avoided in preference for moss, ferns, and evergreens, although ume and Japanese maple can be used.

== Role in Tea Ceremony ==
The garden acts as a transitional space between the outside world and the ritual seclusion of the ceremony. Guests leave behind the outside world and prepare themselves for the aesthetic and spiritual dimension of the ceremony as they pass through the garden. The roji also provides an opportunity for participants to purify themselves before entering the tea house by washing their hands and mouths with water at the tsukubai.

The host carefully cleans the garden before the ceremony begins. The host's preparations for the ceremony are thus an extension of the ritual of the ceremony. Preparing the garden is meant to clean and order the host's mind. During the tea gathering, the roji is sprinkled with water three times as a form of repeated purification: once before the guests arrive, once during the nakadachi (a break in the ceremony), and once before the guests leave the teahouse.

== Influence ==
Sadler argues that the roji, with its small size, harmonious proportions, and 'simple suggestiveness' served as a model for domestic Japanese courtyard gardens. Tobi ishi, originally placed to protect the garden's moss, eventually took on an aesthetic nature. The stones were placed to slow down the visitors on their way to the tea house and encourage contemplation of the everyday, an enduring feature of Japanese gardens. Additionally, tōrō, originally used to light the path for ceremonies held at night, were soon adopted as decorations for other types of gardens, a practice that continues.

== Burakumin ==
In the works of Japanese writer Nakagami Kenji, roji, in the sense of "alley", can also be understood as a euphemism for the buraku ghettos, where burakumin people used to live.

== See also ==
- Tea garden
- Moss garden
- Tsubo-niwa
