= Tea garden =

Outdoor space for tea consumption

A tea garden is an outdoor space where tea and light refreshments are served, or any garden with which the drinking of tea is associated. Especially in India, it is also a common term for a tea plantation. The tea garden was a part of early English commercial pleasure gardens; often parties of couples visited these, the men occupying themselves with lawn bowls and beer or wine, while the ladies went to the tea garden. In modern times it often means an outside area at a cafe or tearoom.

In Japanese gardening, a roji is a particular style of relatively small garden, originally developed for the entry gardens to Japanese teahouses, intended to set the mood of guests arriving for the Japanese tea ceremony. These are designed almost exclusively to be seen from the path leading through them to the building, and tea would not normally be consumed in them. The style is suitable for smaller front gardens of houses, and has often been used for these, both in Japan and the West.

The term may sometimes be used for a herb garden specializing in herbs that are consumed as tea, such as chamomile, bee balm, peppermint, lemon balm, and lavender.

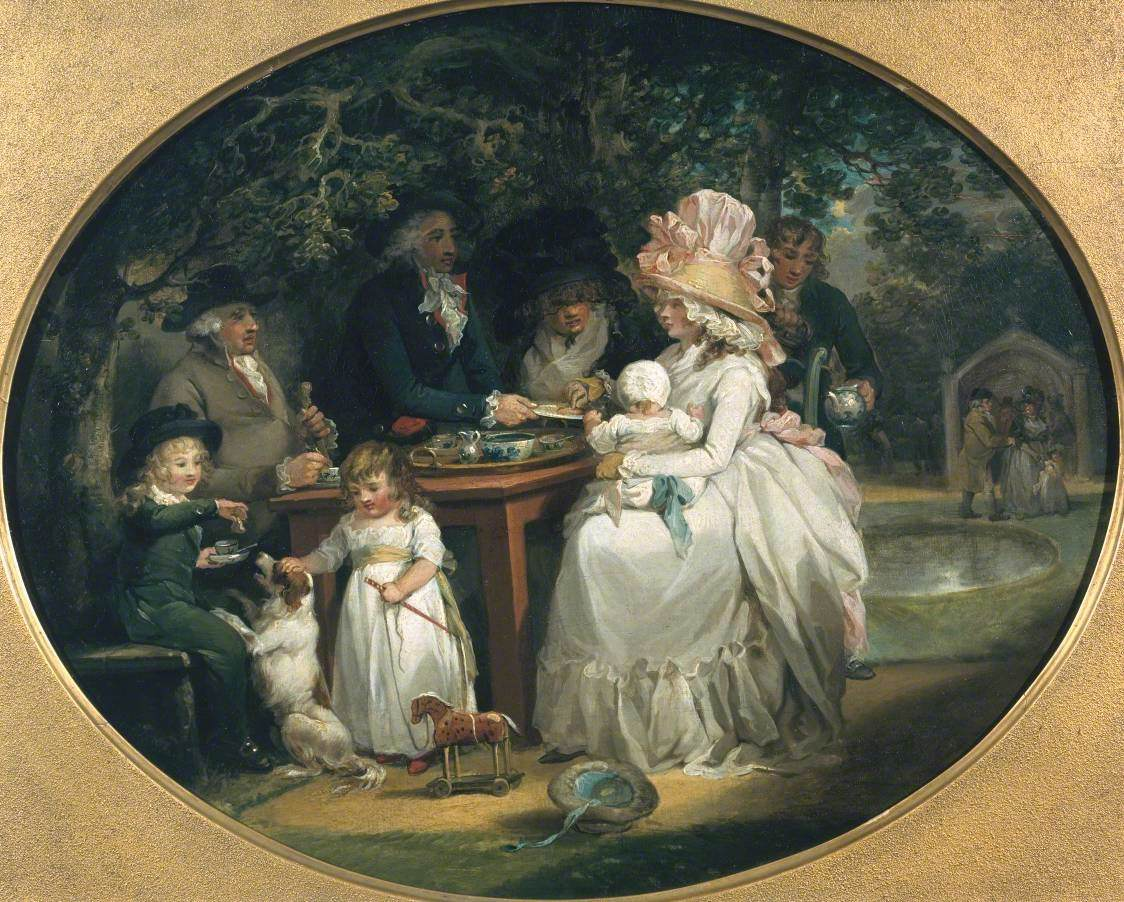
George Morland's The Tea Garden, at Ranelagh Gardens, by 1790.

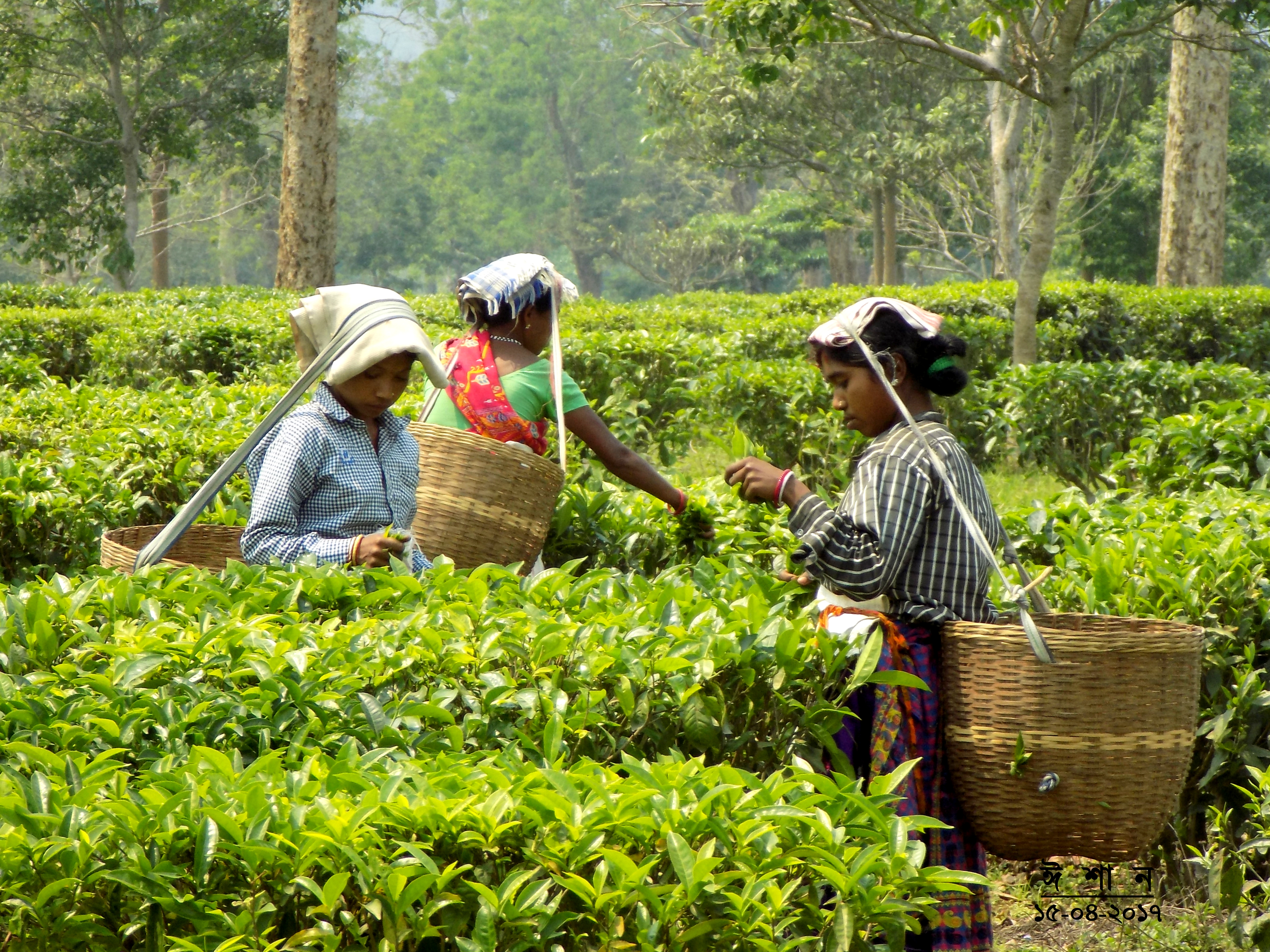
Harvesting Assam tea in 2017

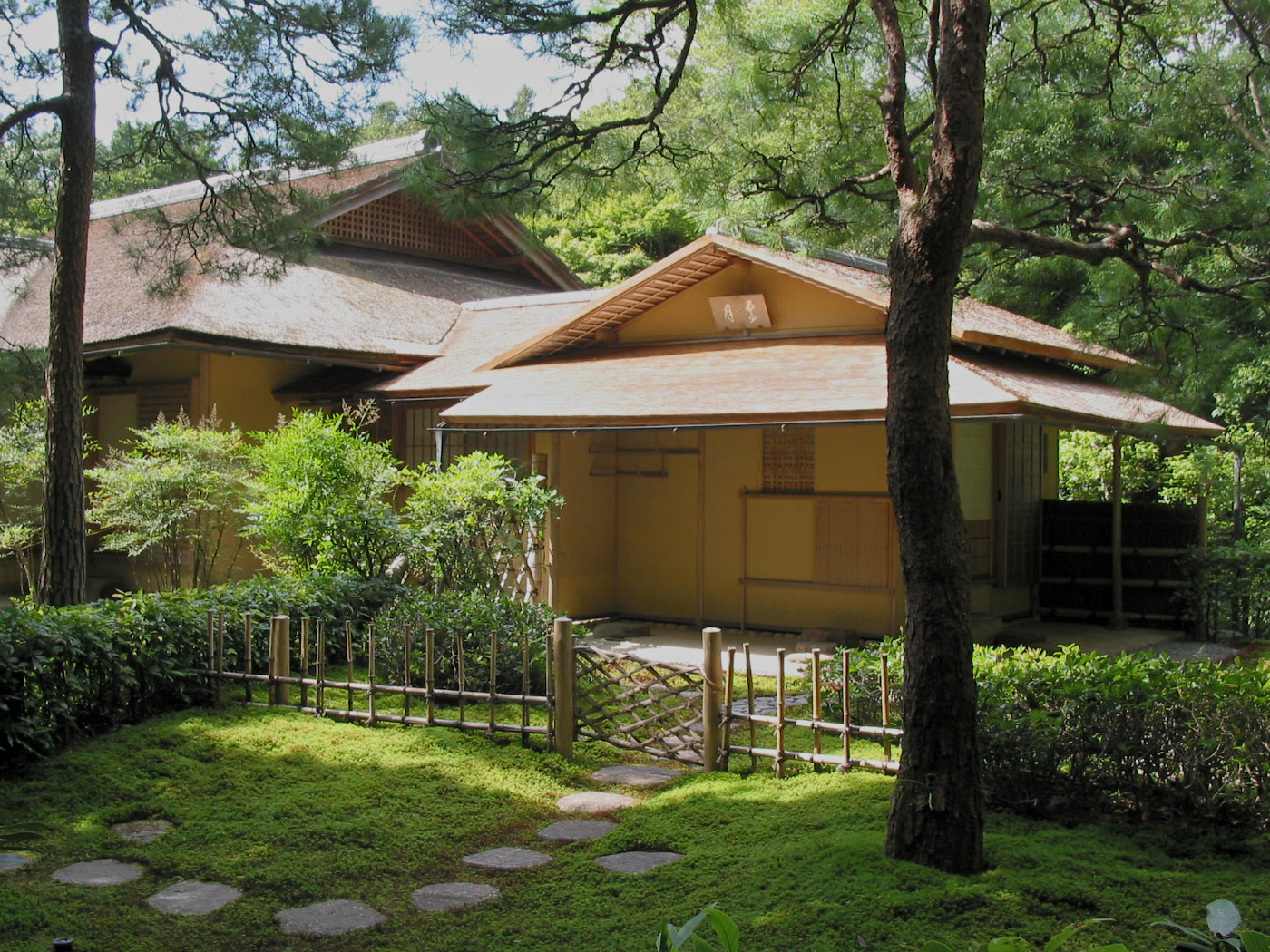
Roji leading to the Seigetsu chashitsu at Ise Jingū; typical features include the stepping stones, moss, bamboo gate, and division into outer and inner gardens.

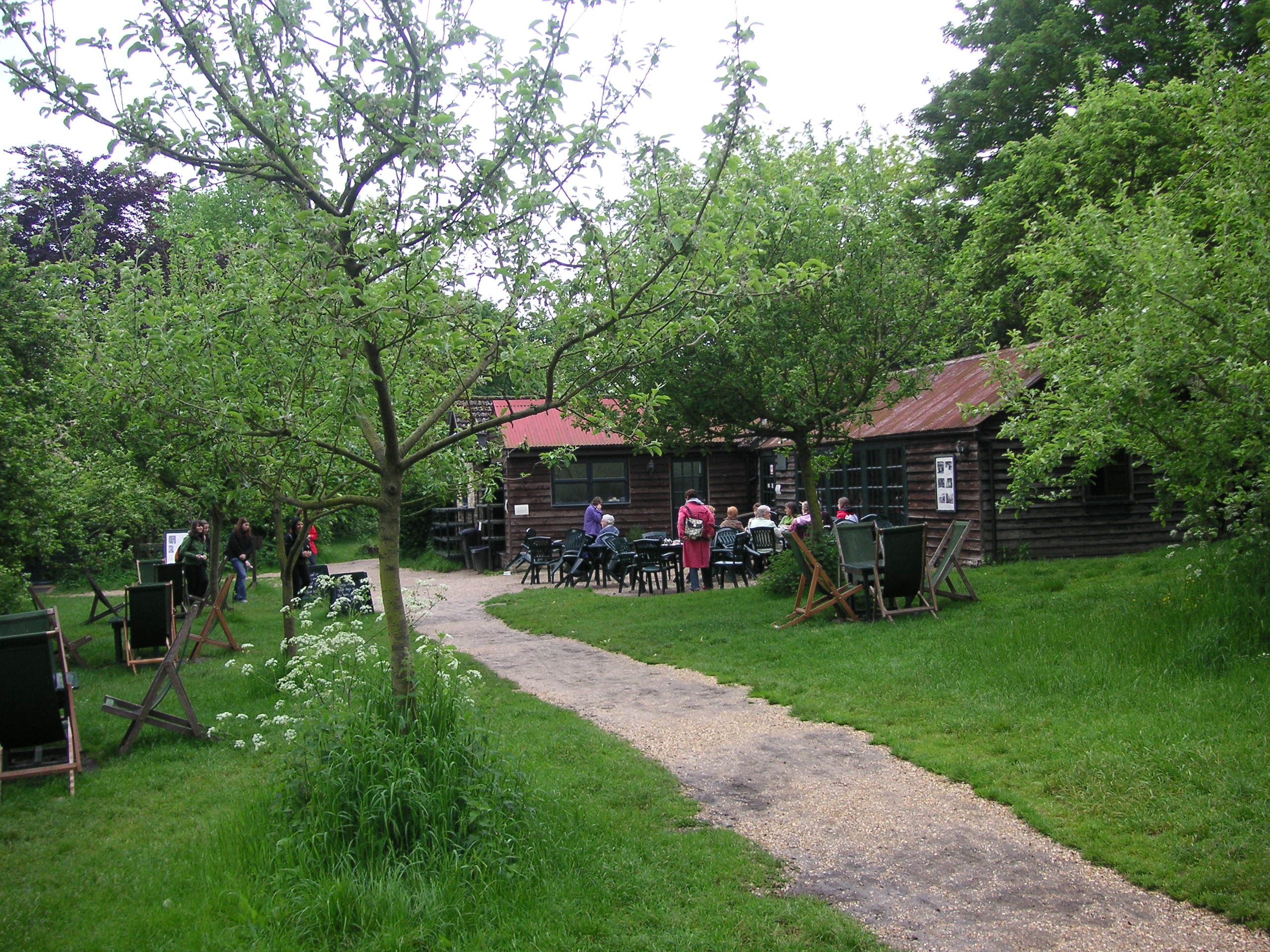
A tea garden in Grantchester, England in 2007

== See also ==
- British tea culture
- List of garden types
- Tea culture
