= Dendropanax colombianus =

Scientific classification
- Kingdom: Plantae
- Clade: Tracheophytes
- Clade: Angiosperms
- Clade: Eudicots
- Clade: Asterids
- Order: Apiales
- Family: Araliaceae
- Genus: Dendropanax
- Species: D. colombianus

Binomial name
- Dendropanax colombianus Cuatrec.

Species of tree

Dendropanax colombianus is a species of tree belonging to the family Araliaceae that is native to the Andean highlands of Colombia and northwestern Venezuela. Common names include mano de oso (bear paw), higuerón, and amarillo (yellow).

Dendropanax colombianus grows up to 20 m (~60 ft.) in height, with alternating palmatilobulated (hand-shaped) leaves. The leaves have reddish backs with long petioles. It is often confused with Oreopanax floribundum due to morphologic similarities.

== Habitat ==
The range of this plant is restricted, growing in the Andes at elevations of 3000-3300m. It is often closely associated with the Encenillo tree (Weinmannia tomentosa).

Dendropanax colombianus is an important habitat for many bird species, and promotes the settlement of other important plants such as Cedro tree (Cedrela montana) and Chuwacá tree (Prunus buxifolia), which the subsequent reforestation in the sub-páramo. Due to the high value of its wood it is a target of the timber industry.
