= Weinmannia stenocarpa =

Conservation status
- Vulnerable (IUCN 3.1)

Scientific classification
- Kingdom: Plantae
- Clade: Embryophytes
- Clade: Tracheophytes
- Clade: Angiosperms
- Clade: Eudicots
- Clade: Rosids
- Order: Oxalidales
- Family: Cunoniaceae
- Genus: Weinmannia
- Species: W. stenocarpa

Binomial name
- Weinmannia stenocarpa Killip & A.C.Sm.

Species of flowering plant

Weinmannia stenocarpa is a species of flowering plant in the family Cunoniaceae. It is a tree endemic to Ecuador. Its natural habitats are subtropical or tropical moist montane forests and subtropical or tropical high-elevation shrubland.
