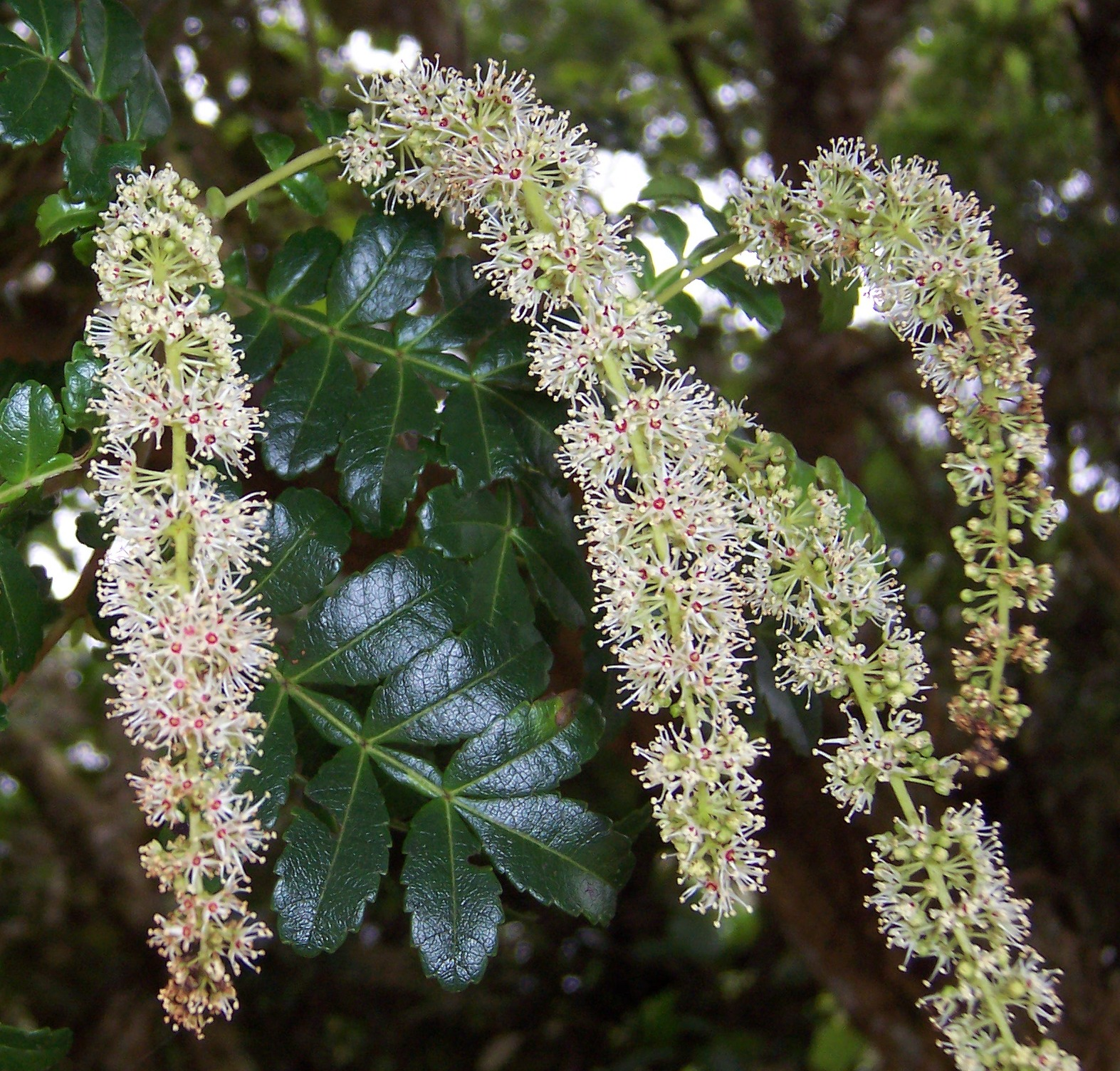

Conservation status
- Critically Endangered (IUCN 2.3)

Scientific classification
- Kingdom: Plantae
- Clade: Tracheophytes
- Clade: Angiosperms
- Clade: Eudicots
- Clade: Rosids
- Order: Oxalidales
- Family: Cunoniaceae
- Genus: Weinmannia
- Species: W. tinctoria

Binomial name
- Weinmannia tinctoria J.E. Smith

= Weinmannia tinctoria =

Species of flowering plant

Weinmannia tinctoria is a species of plant in the family Cunoniaceae. It is found in Mauritius and Réunion off the east coast of Africa.

== Conservation ==
It is an IUCN Red List Critically endangered species, threatened by habitat loss. In Mauritius, the population is estimated to be less than 50 individuals.
