= Uchimizu =

Japanese water sprinkling practice

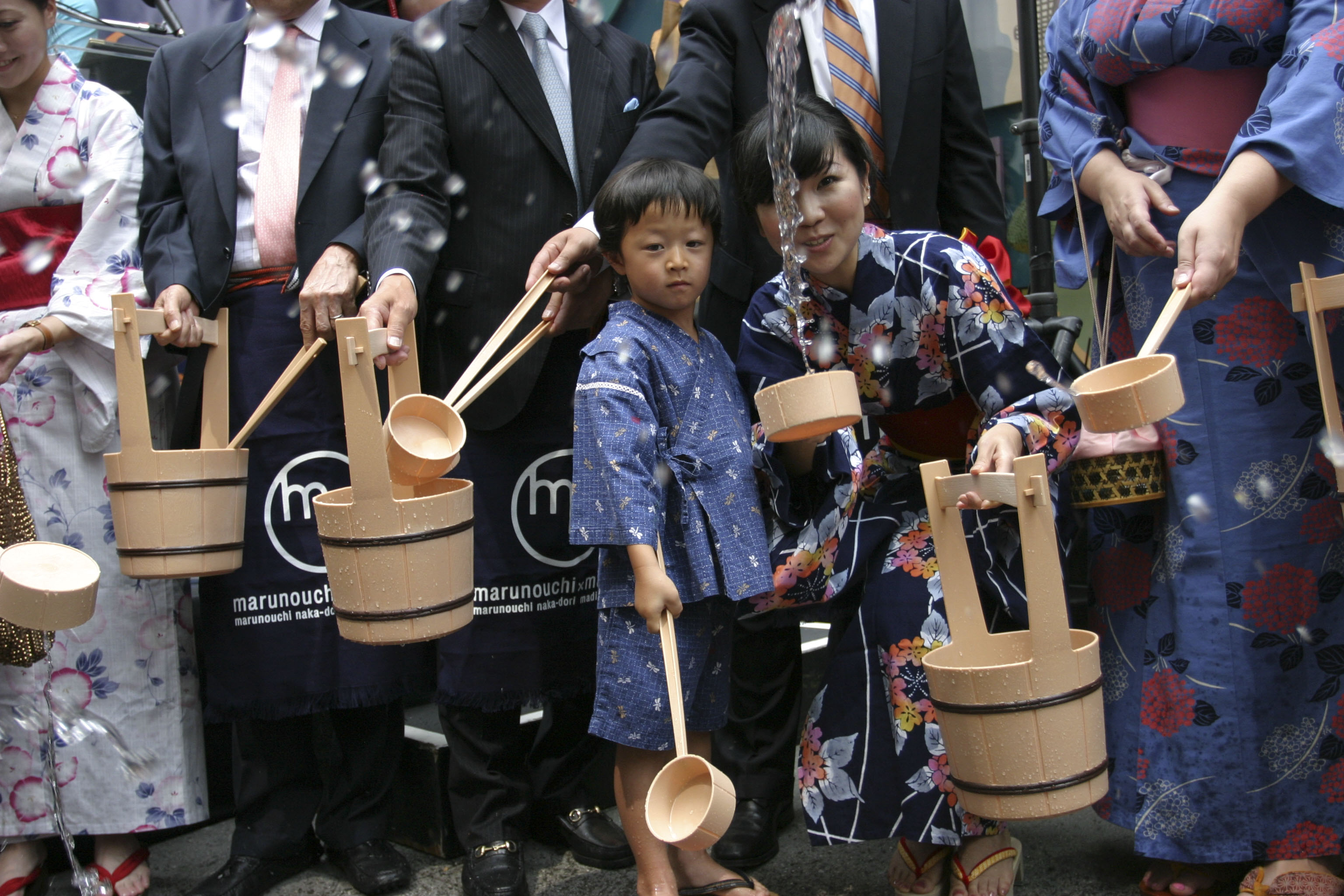
Participants in an uchimizu ceremony in New York City

Uchimizu (打ち水) refers to the sprinkling of water in Japanese gardens and streets. It is more than a mere matter of hygiene and has, in temples and gardens, a ritual or contemplative purpose. In streets in summer, it serves to cool the immediate area, keep down dust, and also please neighbors. Japanese people see uchimizu as exemplifying national values as it combines utilitarian, aesthetic, courteous, and dutiful ends.

Traditionally, this was done with a bucket and ladle and the sprinkler would wear a yukata or summer kimono. In its more modern forms, various green groups have used the Internet to encourage people in Japan to do uchimizu with recycled water as a form of environmentally aware public courtesy.

== Practice ==
=== "Mission Uchimizu" ===
A public campaign for uchimizu, named “Sidewalk Sprinkling Campaign in Tokyo,” was initiated in 2003 by a coalition of non-profit organizations. This campaign aimed to address the issue of climate change and the urban heat island effect, which is the phenomenon of urban areas having higher temperatures than that of rural ones. The campaign was conducted on August 25 in Tokyo, where participants were encouraged to sprinkle the streets with recycled rain and bath water. An estimated 340,000 people participated, with some dressed in yukata to honor traditional Japanese culture. After the event, temperatures were reported to have decreased by one degree Celsius.

In 2004, the campaign extended to places outside of Tokyo and its duration was extended to one week, from August 18 to 25. The campaign was also renamed "Sidewalk Sprinkling Campaign" and an estimated 3.29 million people participated. In 2005, participation levels reached an estimated 7.7 million, and in 2006, the dates for the campaign were permanently set from July 23 to August 23. The campaign received its English name, "Mission Uchimizu," in 2006 and 70 percent of Japanese people are now aware of the campaign.
