= Friedrich Gottlieb Dietrich =

German botanist

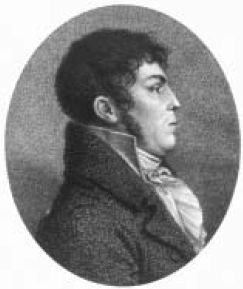
- Born: c. 1767; Ziegenhain
- Died: 2 January 1850 (aged c. 83); Eisenach
- Scientific career
- Fields: Botany

Friedrich Gottlieb Dietrich (1765 or 1768 – 2 January 1850) was a German botanist. He used the author abbreviation F.Dietr. He wrote the book Die Weimarische Flora in 1800 and over 30 editions of Vollständiges Lexicon der Gärtnerei und Botanik between the years of 1802 and 1840.
