= Japanese garden =

Type of traditional garden

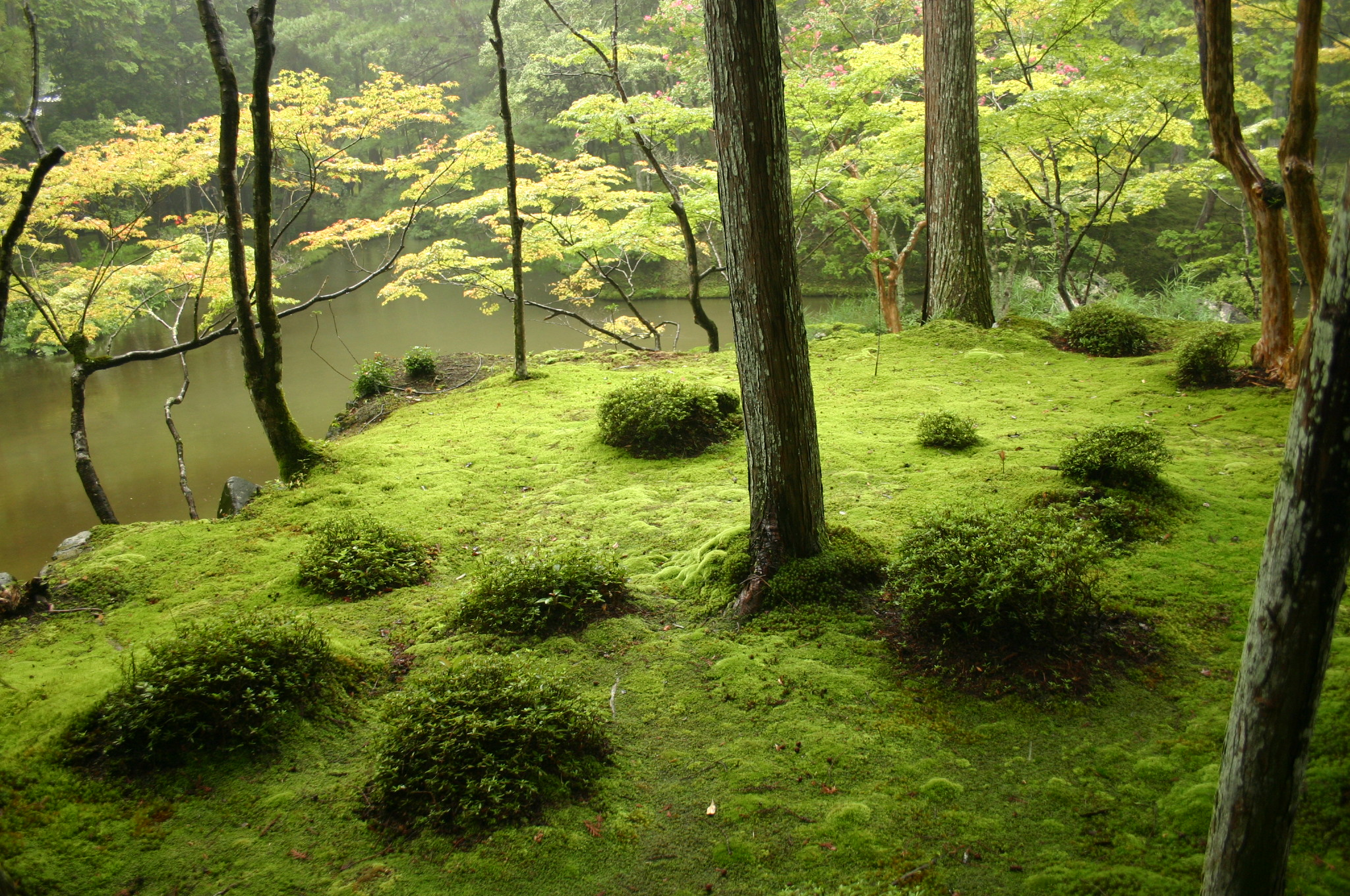
The moss garden at the Saihō-ji temple in Kyoto, started in 1339

Japanese gardens (日本庭園, nihon teien) are traditional gardens whose designs are accompanied by Japanese aesthetics and philosophical ideas, avoid artificial ornamentation, and highlight the natural landscape. Plants and worn, aged materials are generally used by Japanese garden designers to suggest a natural landscape, and to express the fragility of existence as well as time's unstoppable advance. Ancient Japanese art inspired past garden designers. Water is an important feature of many gardens, as are rocks and often gravel. Despite there being many attractive Japanese flowering plants, herbaceous flowers generally play much less of a role in Japanese gardens than in the West, though seasonally flowering shrubs and trees are important, all the more dramatic because of the contrast with the usual predominant green. Evergreen plants are "the bones of the garden" in Japan. Though a natural-seeming appearance is the aim, Japanese gardeners often shape their plants, including trees, with great rigour.

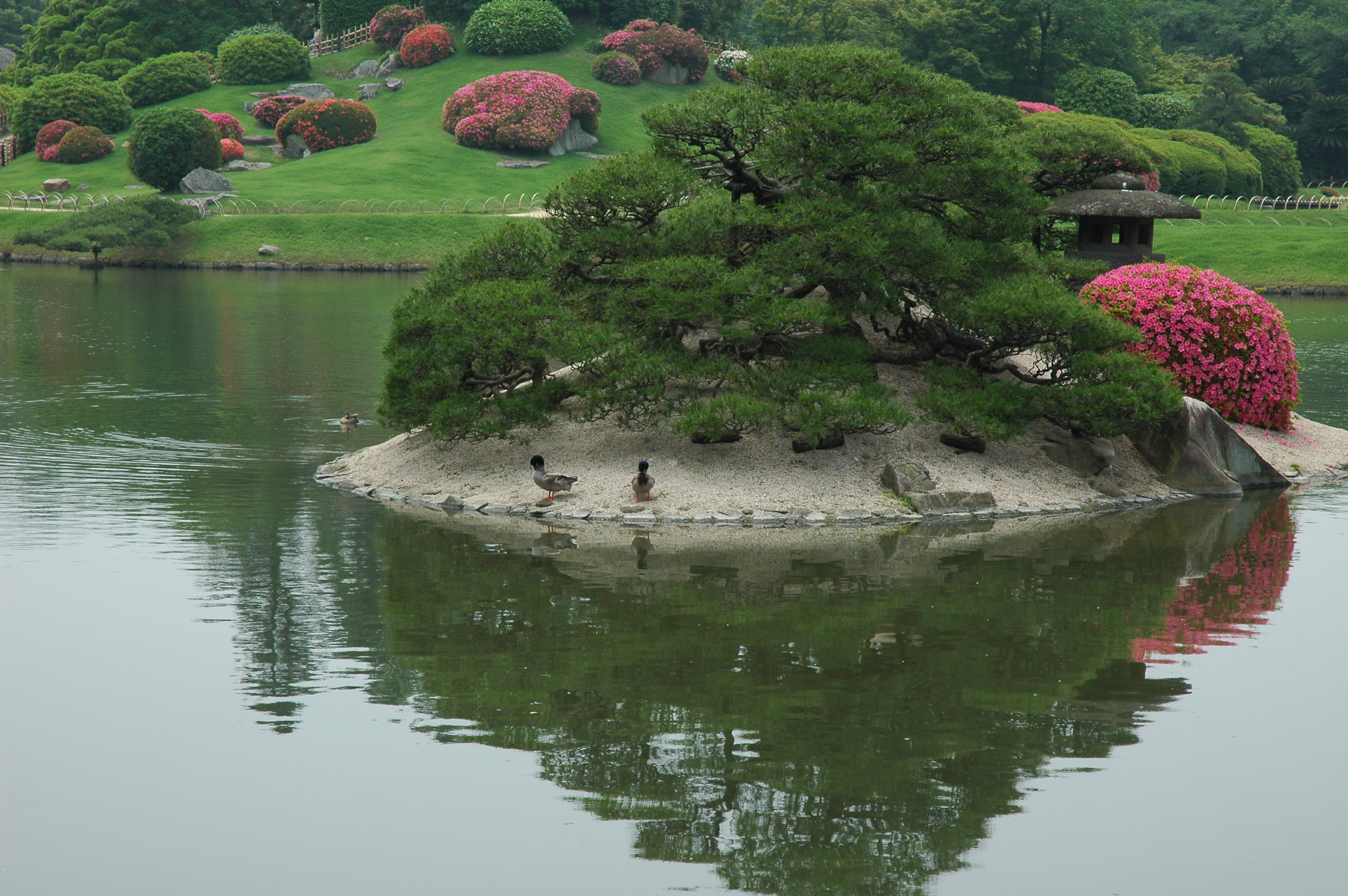
An island in Kōraku-en gardens, Okayama, with azaleas in flower

Japanese literature on gardening goes back almost a thousand years, and several different styles of garden have developed, some with religious or philosophical implications. A characteristic of Japanese gardens is that they are designed to be seen from specific points. Some of the most significant different traditional styles of Japanese garden are the chisen-shoyū-teien ("lake-spring-boat excursion garden"), which was imported from China during the Heian period (794–1185). These were designed to be seen from small boats on the central lake. No original examples of these survive, but they were replaced by the "paradise garden" associated with Pure Land Buddhism, with a Buddha shrine on an island in the lake. Later large gardens are often in the kaiyū-shiki-teien, or promenade garden style, designed to be seen from a path circulating around the garden, with fixed stopping points for viewing. Specialized styles, often small sections in a larger garden, include the moss garden, the dry garden with gravel and rocks, associated with Zen Buddhism, the roji or teahouse garden, designed to be seen only from a short pathway, and the tsubo-niwa, a very small urban garden.

Most modern Japanese homes have little space for a garden, though the tsubo-niwa style of tiny gardens in passages and other spaces, as well as bonsai (in Japan always grown outside) and houseplants mitigates this, and domestic garden tourism is very important. The Japanese tradition has long been to keep a well-designed garden as near as possible to its original condition, and many famous gardens appear to have changed little over several centuries, apart from the inevitable turnover of plants, in a way that is extremely rare in the West.

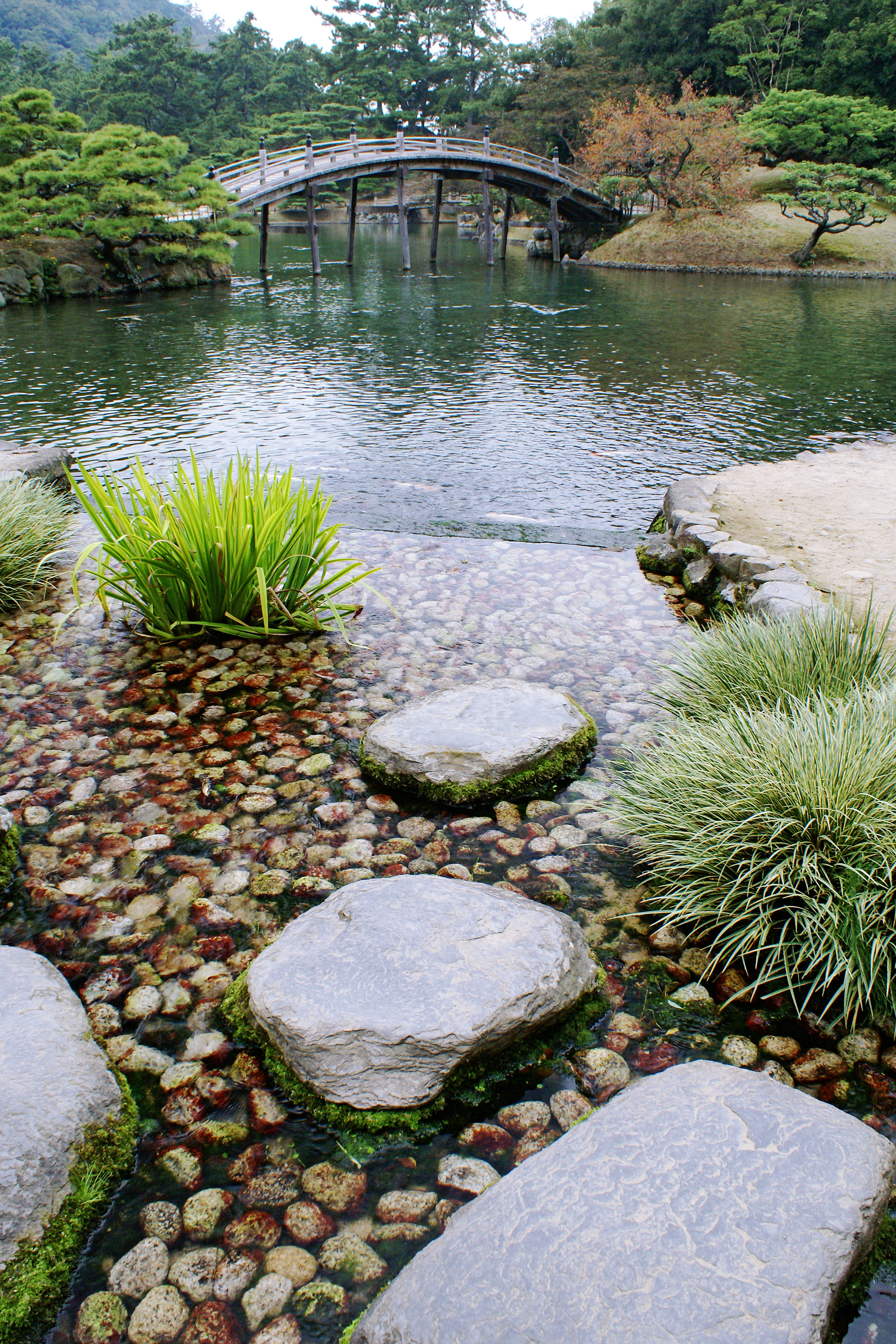
Carefully positioned stones around the pond in Ritsurin Garden

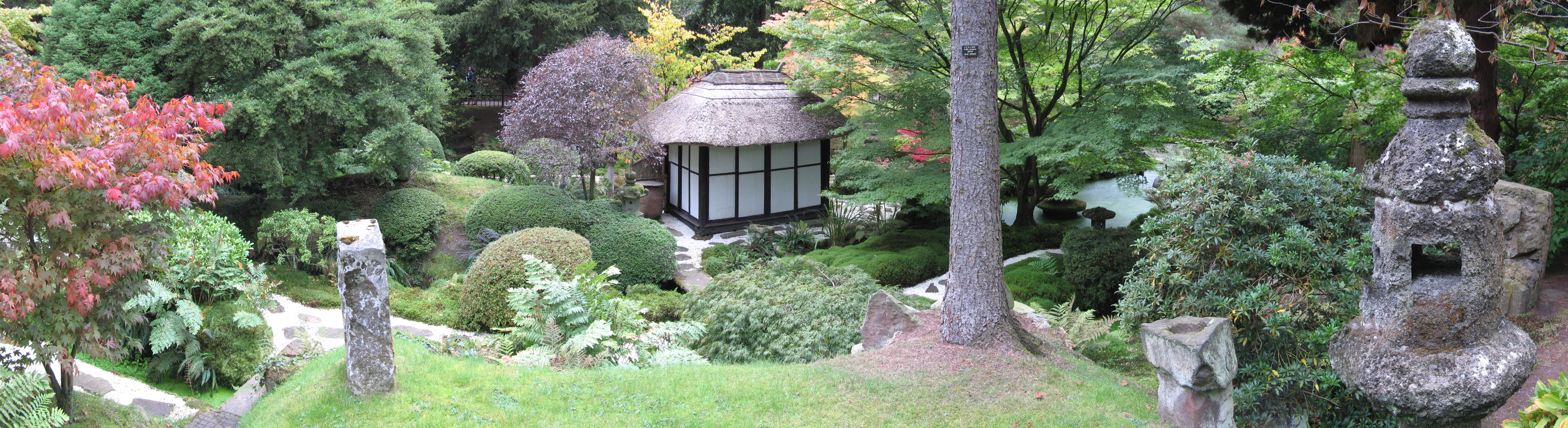
Japanese Garden in the Tatton Park Gardens, England

Awareness of the Japanese style of gardening reached the West near the end of the 19th century, and was enthusiastically received as part of the fashion for Japonisme, and as Western gardening taste had by then turned away from rigid geometry to a more naturalistic style, of which the Japanese style was an attractive variant. They were immediately popular in the UK, where the climate was similar and Japanese plants grew well. Japanese gardens, typically a section of a larger garden, continue to be popular in the West, and many typical Japanese garden plants, such as cherry trees and the many varieties of Acer palmatum or Japanese maple, are also used in all types of garden, giving a faint hint of the style to very many gardens.

== History ==
=== Origins ===
The ideas central to Japanese gardens were first introduced to Japan during the Asuka period (c. 6th to 7th century).

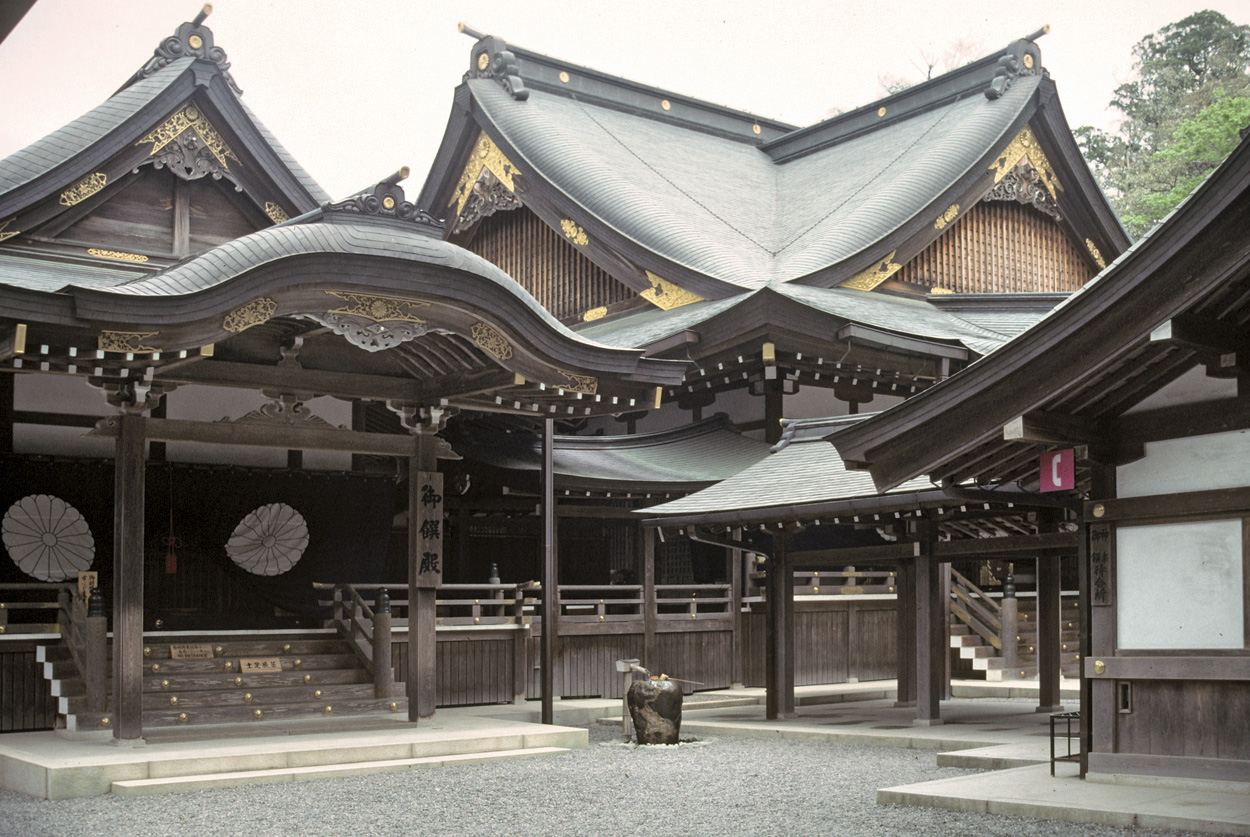
Ise Jingu, a Shinto shrine begun in the 7th century, surrounded by white gravel

Japanese gardens first appeared on the island of Honshu, the large central island of Japan. Their aesthetic was influenced by the distinct characteristics of the Honshu landscape: rugged volcanic peaks, narrow valleys, mountain streams with waterfalls and cascades, lakes, and beaches of small stones. They were also influenced by the rich variety of flowers and different species of trees, particularly evergreen trees, on the islands, and by the four distinct seasons in Japan, including hot, wet summers and snowy winters.

Japanese gardens have their roots in the national religion of Shinto, with its story of the creation of eight perfect islands, and of the shinchi, the lakes of the gods. Prehistoric Shinto shrines to the kami, the gods and spirits, are found on beaches and in forests all over the island. They often took the form of unusual rocks or trees marked with cords of rice fiber (shimenawa) and surrounded with white stones or pebbles, a symbol of purity. The white gravel courtyard became a distinctive feature of Shinto shrines, Imperial Palaces, Buddhist temples, and Zen gardens. Although its original meaning is somewhat obscure, one of the Japanese words for garden—niwa—came to mean a place that had been cleansed and purified in anticipation of the arrival of kami, and the Shinto reverence for great rocks, lakes, ancient trees, and other "dignitaries of nature" would exert an enduring influence on Japanese garden design.

Japanese gardens were also strongly influenced by the Chinese philosophy of Daoism and Amida Buddhism, imported from China in or around 552 CE. Daoist legends spoke of five mountainous islands inhabited by the Eight Immortals, who lived in perfect harmony with nature. Each Immortal flew from his mountain home on the back of a crane. The islands themselves were located on the back of an enormous sea turtle. In Japan, the five islands of the Chinese legend became one island, called Horai-zen, or Mount Horai. Replicas of this legendary mountain, the symbol of a perfect world, are a common feature of Japanese gardens, as are rocks representing turtles and cranes.

=== In antiquity ===
The earliest recorded Japanese gardens were the pleasure gardens of the emperors and nobles. They are mentioned in several brief passages of the Nihon Shoki, the first chronicle of Japanese history, published in 720 CE. In spring 74 CE, the chronicle recorded: "The Emperor Keikō put a few carp into a pond, and rejoiced to see them morning and evening". The following year, "The Emperor launched a double-hulled boat in the pond of Ijishi at Ihare, and went aboard with his imperial concubine, and they feasted sumptuously together". In 486, the chronicle recorded that "The Emperor Kenzō went into the garden and feasted at the edge of a winding stream".

Chinese gardens had a very strong influence on early Japanese gardens. In or around 552 CE, Buddhism was officially installed from China, via Korea, into Japan. Between 600 and 612 CE, the Japanese emperor sent four legations to the court of the Chinese Sui dynasty. Between 630 and 838 CE, the Japanese court sent fifteen more legations to the court of the Tang dynasty. These legations, with more than five hundred members each, included diplomats, scholars, students, Buddhist monks, and translators. They brought back Chinese writing, art objects, and detailed descriptions of Chinese gardens.

In 612 CE, the Empress Suiko had a garden built with an artificial mountain, representing Shumi-Sen, or Mount Sumeru, reputed in Hindu and Buddhist legends to be located at the centre of the world. During the reign of the same empress, one of her ministers, Soga no Umako, had a garden built at his palace featuring a lake with several small islands, representing the islands of the Eight Immortals famous in Chinese legends and Daoist philosophy. This palace became the property of the Japanese emperors, was named "The Palace of the Isles", and was mentioned several times in the Man'yōshū, the "Collection of Countless Leaves", the oldest known collection of Japanese poetry.

=== Nara period (710–794) ===
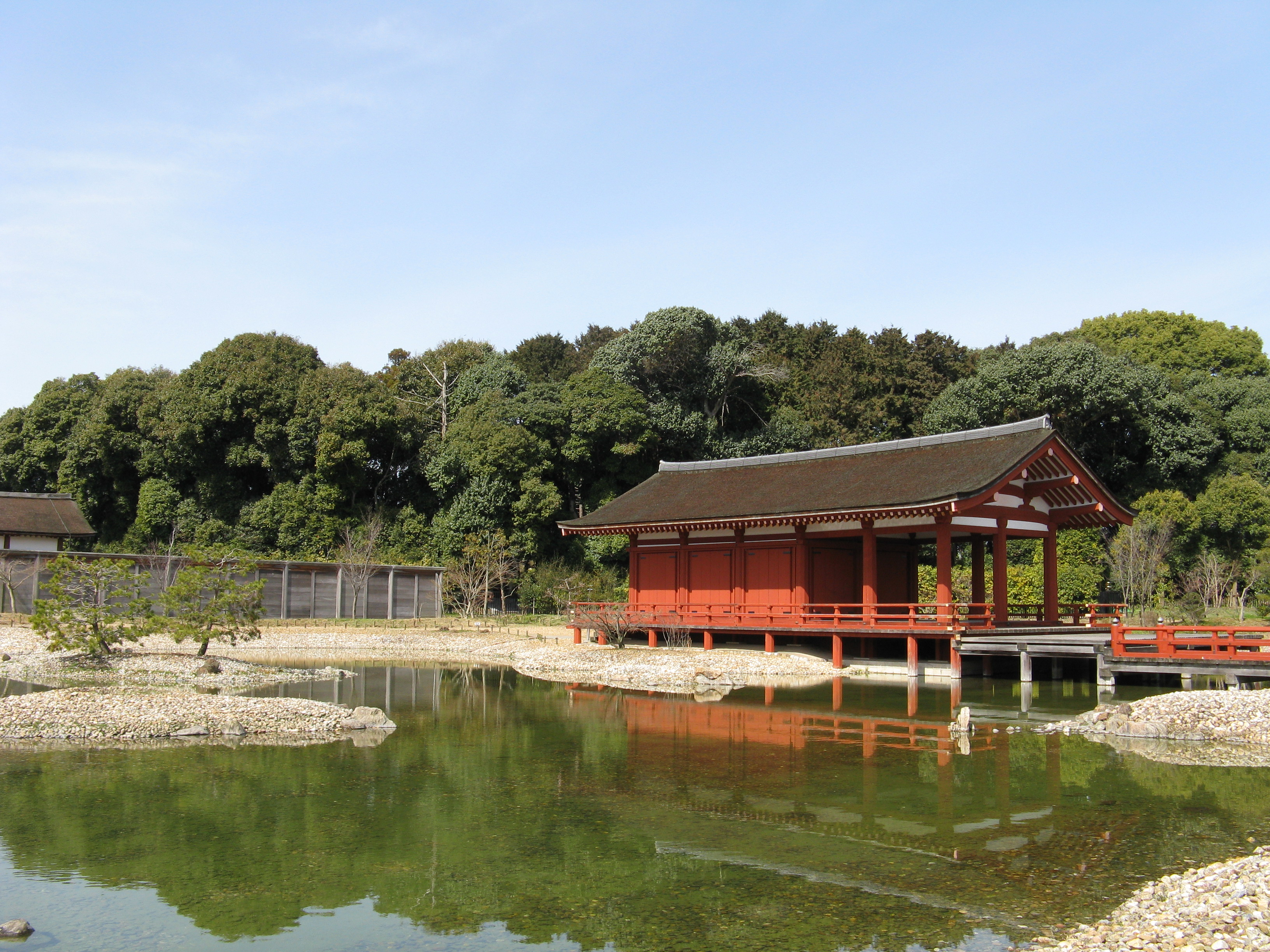
A view of the Eastern Palace gardens (東院庭園) main pavilion

The Nara period is named after its capital city Nara. The first authentically Japanese gardens were built in this city at the end of the 8th century. Shorelines and stone settings were naturalistic, different from the heavier, earlier continental mode of constructing pond edges. Two such gardens have been found at excavations, both of which were used for poetry-writing festivities. One of these gardens, the East Palace garden at Heijō Palace, Nara, has been faithfully reconstructed using the same location and even the original garden features that had been excavated. It appears from the small amount of literary and archaeological evidence available that the Japanese gardens of this time were modest versions of the Imperial gardens of the Tang dynasty, with large lakes scattered with artificial islands and artificial mountains. Pond edges were constructed with heavy rocks as embankment. While these gardens had some Buddhist and Daoist symbolism, they were meant to be pleasure gardens, and places for festivals and celebrations.

Recent archaeological excavations in the ancient capital of Nara have brought to light the remains of two 8th-century gardens associated with the Imperial Court, a pond and stream garden – the To-in – located within the precinct of the Imperial Palace and a stream garden – Kyuseki – found within the modern city. They may be modeled after Chinese gardens, but the rock formations found in the To-in would appear to have more in common with prehistoric Japanese stone monuments than with Chinese antecedents, and the natural, serpentine course of the Kyuseki stream garden may be far less formal than what existed in Tang China. Whatever their origins, both the To-in and Kyuseki clearly anticipate certain developments in later Japanese gardens.

=== Heian period (794–1185) ===
In 794 CE, at the beginning of the Heian period (794–1185 CE), the Japanese court moved its capital to Heian-kyō (present-day Kyoto). During this period, there were three different kinds of gardens: palace gardens and the gardens of nobles in the capital, the gardens of villas at the edge of the city, and the gardens of temples.

The architecture of the palaces, residences and gardens in the Heian period followed Chinese practice. Houses and gardens were aligned on a north-south axis, with the residence to the north and the ceremonial buildings and main garden to the south, there were two long wings to the south, like the arms of an armchair, with the garden between them. The gardens featured one or more lakes connected by bridges and winding streams. The south garden of the imperial residences had a uniquely Japanese feature: a large empty area of white sand or gravel. The emperor was the chief priest of Japan, and the white sand represented purity, and was a place where the gods could be invited to visit. The area was used for religious ceremonies and dances for the welcoming of the gods.

The layout of the garden itself was strictly determined according to the principles of traditional Chinese geomancy, or Feng Shui. The first known book on the art of the Japanese garden, the Sakuteiki (Records of Garden Keeping), written in the 11th century, said:

It is a good omen to make the stream arrive from the east, to enter the garden, pass under the house, and then leave from the southeast. In this way, the water of the blue dragon will carry away all the bad spirits from the house toward the white tiger.

The Imperial gardens of the Heian period were water gardens, where visitors promenaded in elegant lacquered boats, listening to music, viewing the distant mountains, singing, reading poetry, painting, and admiring the scenery. The social life in the gardens was memorably described in the classic Japanese novel The Tale of Genji, written in about 1005 by Murasaki Shikibu, a lady-in-waiting to the empress. The traces of one such artificial lake, Osawa no ike, near the Daikaku-ji temple in Kyoto, still can be seen. It was built by the Emperor Saga, who ruled from 809 to 823, and was said to be inspired by Dongting Lake in China.

A scaled-down replica of the Kyoto Imperial Palace of 794, the Heian-jingū, was built in Kyoto in 1895 to celebrate the 1100th birthday of the city. The south garden is famous for its cherry blossom in spring, and for azaleas in the early summer. The west garden is known for its irises in June, and the large east garden lake recalls the leisurely boating parties of the 8th century. Near the end of the Heian period, a new garden architecture style appeared, created by the followers of Pure Land Buddhism. These were called "Paradise Gardens", built to represent the legendary Paradise of the West, where the Amida Buddha ruled. These were built by noblemen who wanted to assert their power and independence from the Imperial household, which was growing weaker.

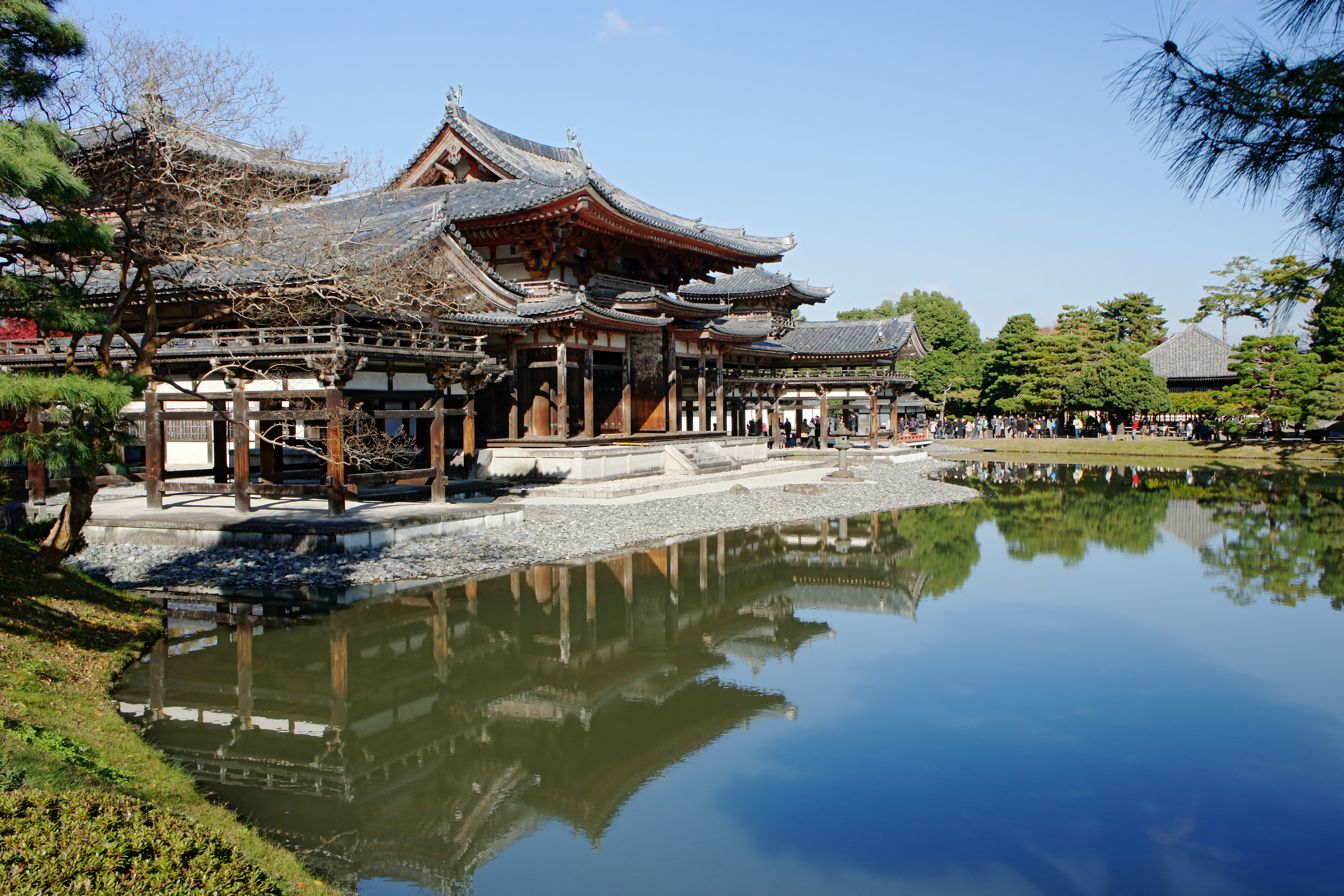
Byōdō-in: Jōdo-shiki garden

The best surviving example of a Paradise Garden is Byōdō-in in Uji, near Kyoto. It was originally the villa of Fujiwara Michinaga (966–1028), who married his daughters to the sons of the Emperor. After his death, his son transformed the villa into a temple, and in 1053 built the Hall of Phoenix, which still stands.

The Hall is built in the traditional style of a Chinese Song dynasty temple, on an island in the lake. It houses a gilded statue of the Amitābha Buddha, looking to the west. In the lake in front of the temple is a small island of white stones, representing Mount Horai, the home of the Eight Immortals of the Daoists, connected to the temple by a bridge, which symbolized the way to paradise. It was designed for mediation and contemplation, not as a pleasure garden. It was a lesson in Daoist and Buddhist philosophy created with landscape and architecture, and a prototype for future Japanese gardens.

Notable existing or recreated Heian gardens include:

- Daikaku-ji
- Byōdō-in
- Kyoto Imperial Palace
- Jōruri-ji
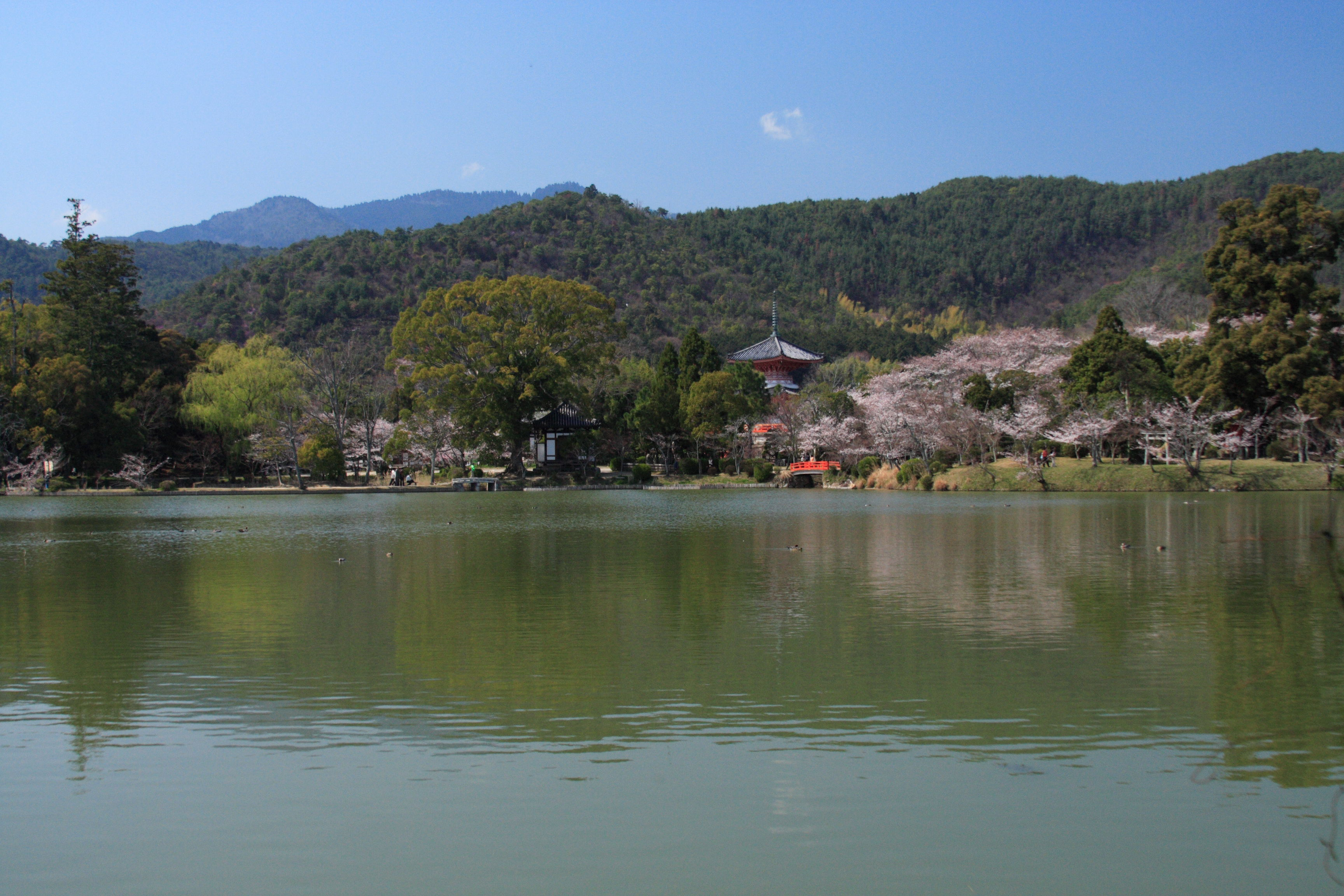
Osawa lake in Kyoto was part of the old imperial gardens of the Emperor Saga (809–823).

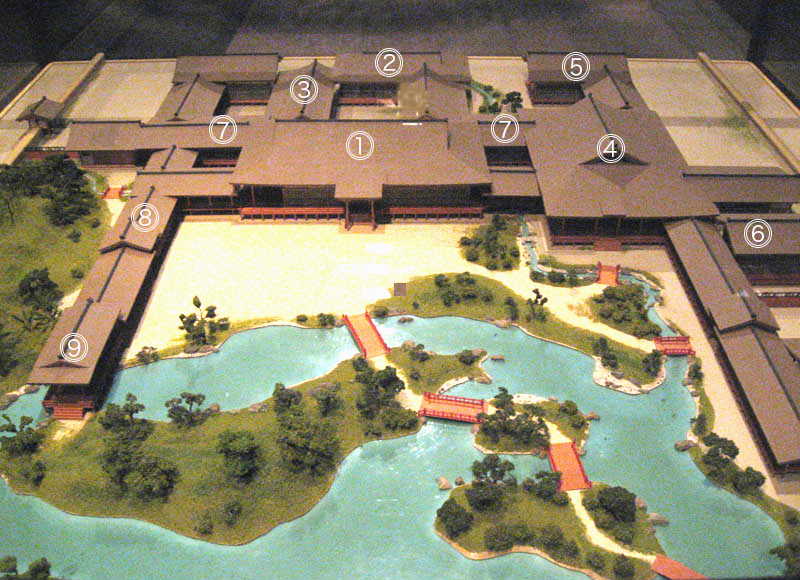
Model of a residence and garden at Heian-kyō (Kyoto), around 1000

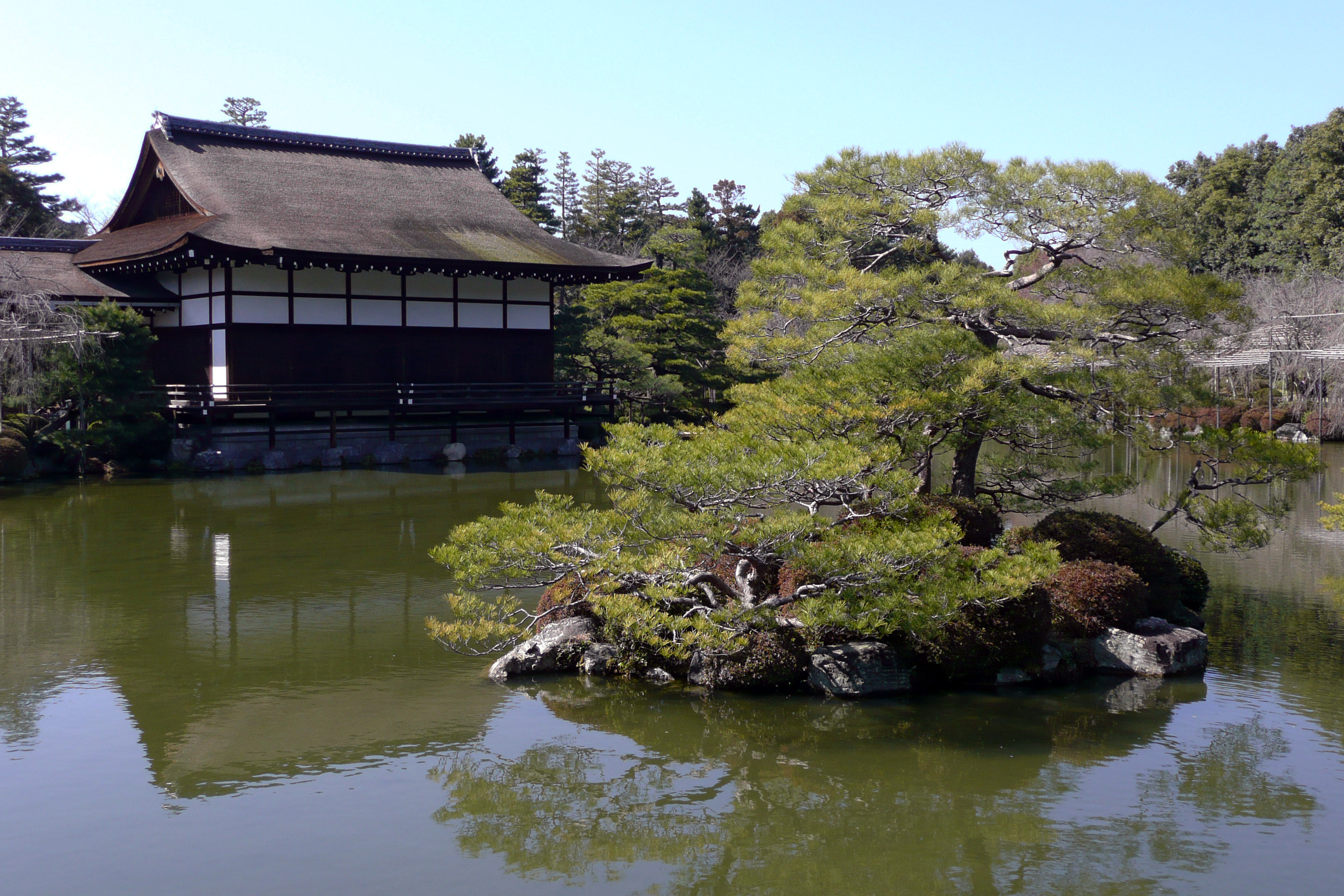
A 19th-century scaled-down reconstruction of the Heian-jingū, the first Kyoto Imperial Palace garden, as it was in 794

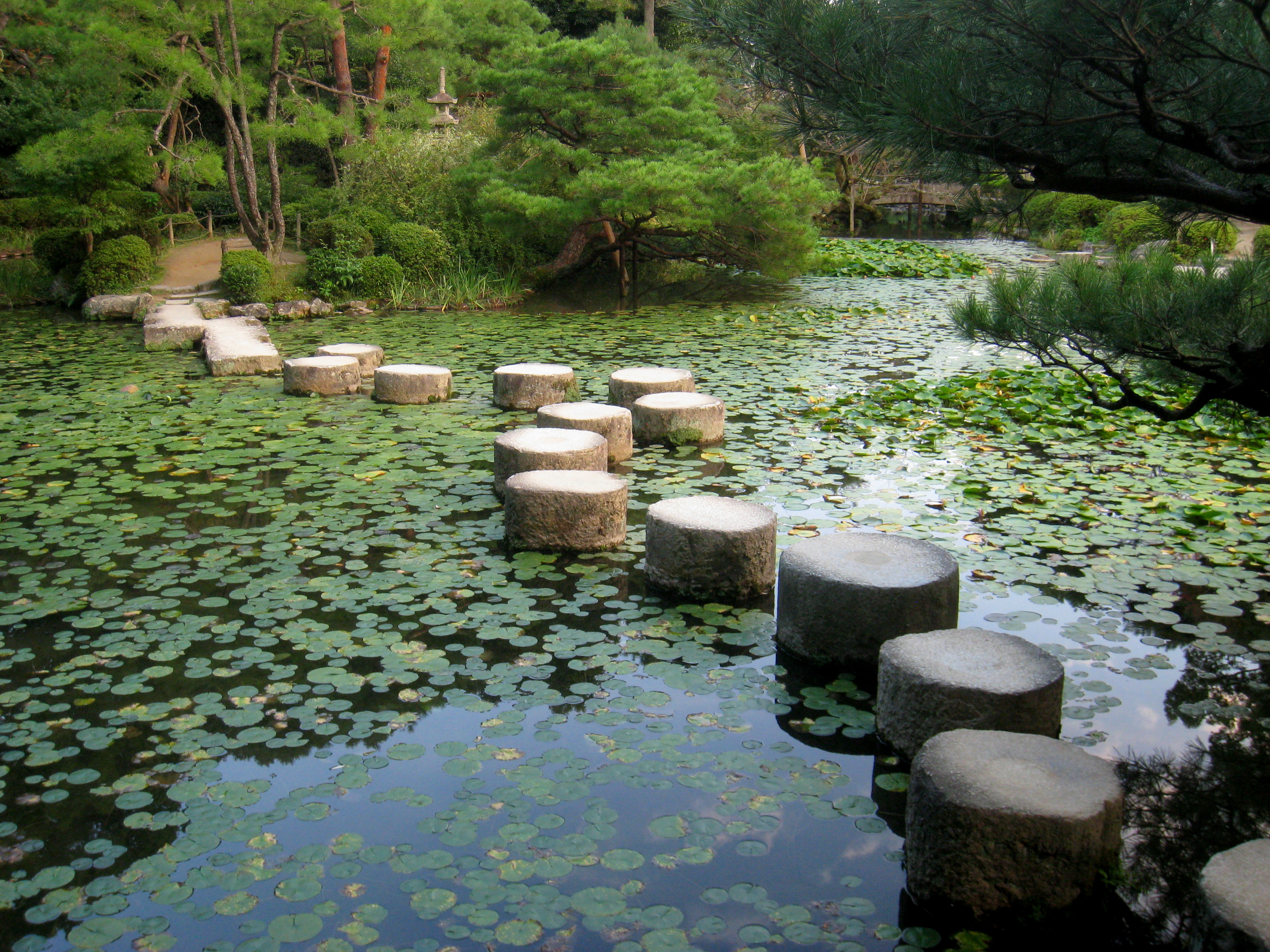
Stepping stones in the garden of the first Kyoto Imperial Palace. These stones were originally part of a 16th-century bridge over the Kamo River, which was destroyed by an earthquake.

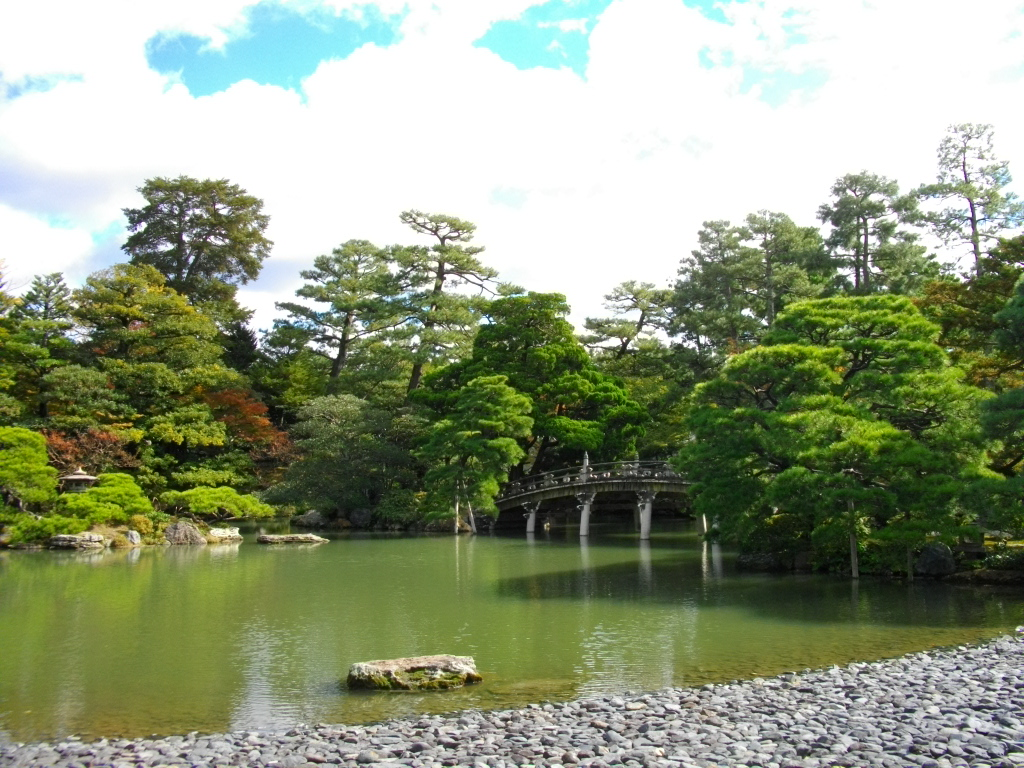
Recreated garden of the old Kyoto Imperial Palace

=== Kamakura and Muromachi periods (1185–1573) ===
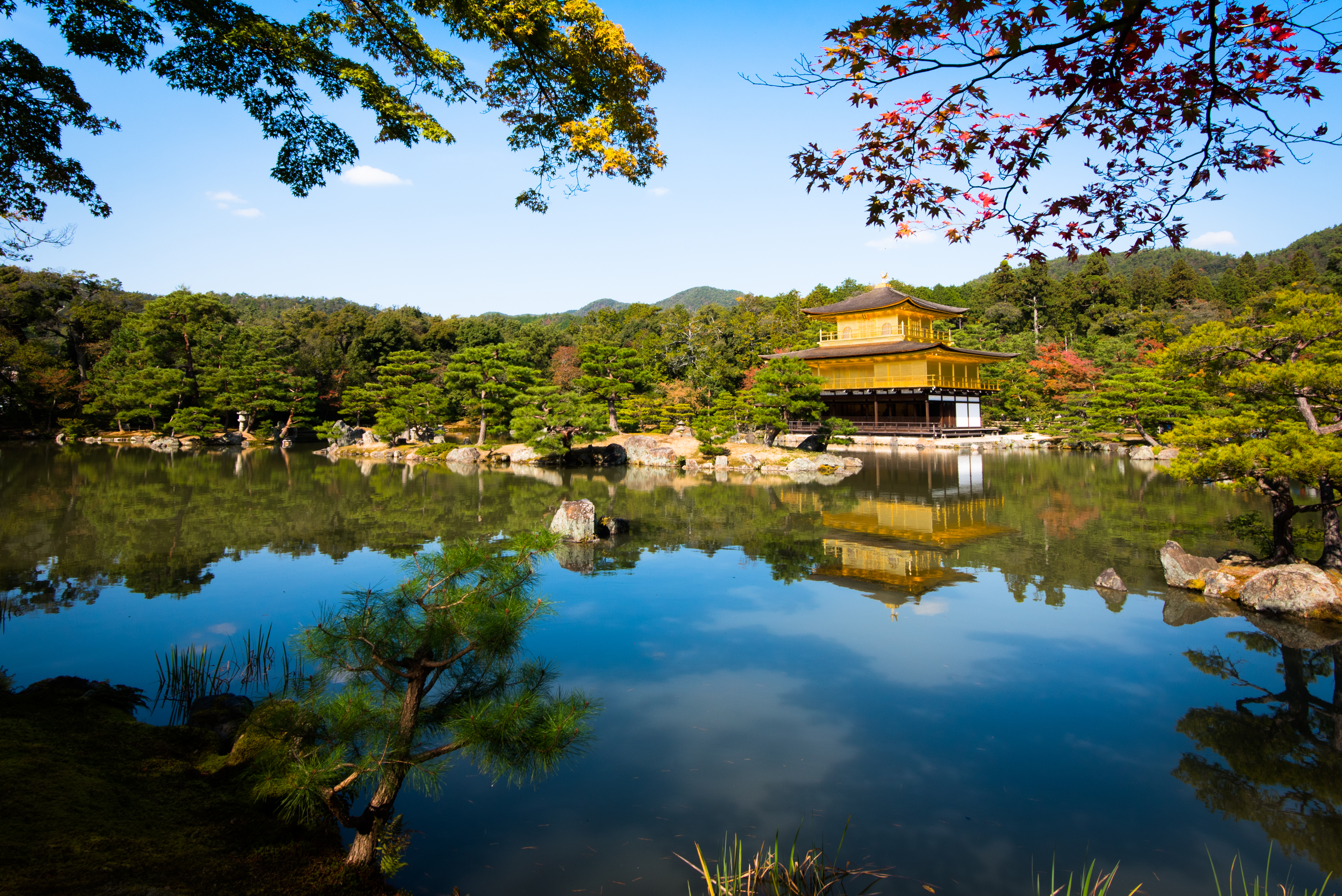
Kinkaku-ji, the Golden Pavilion (1398)

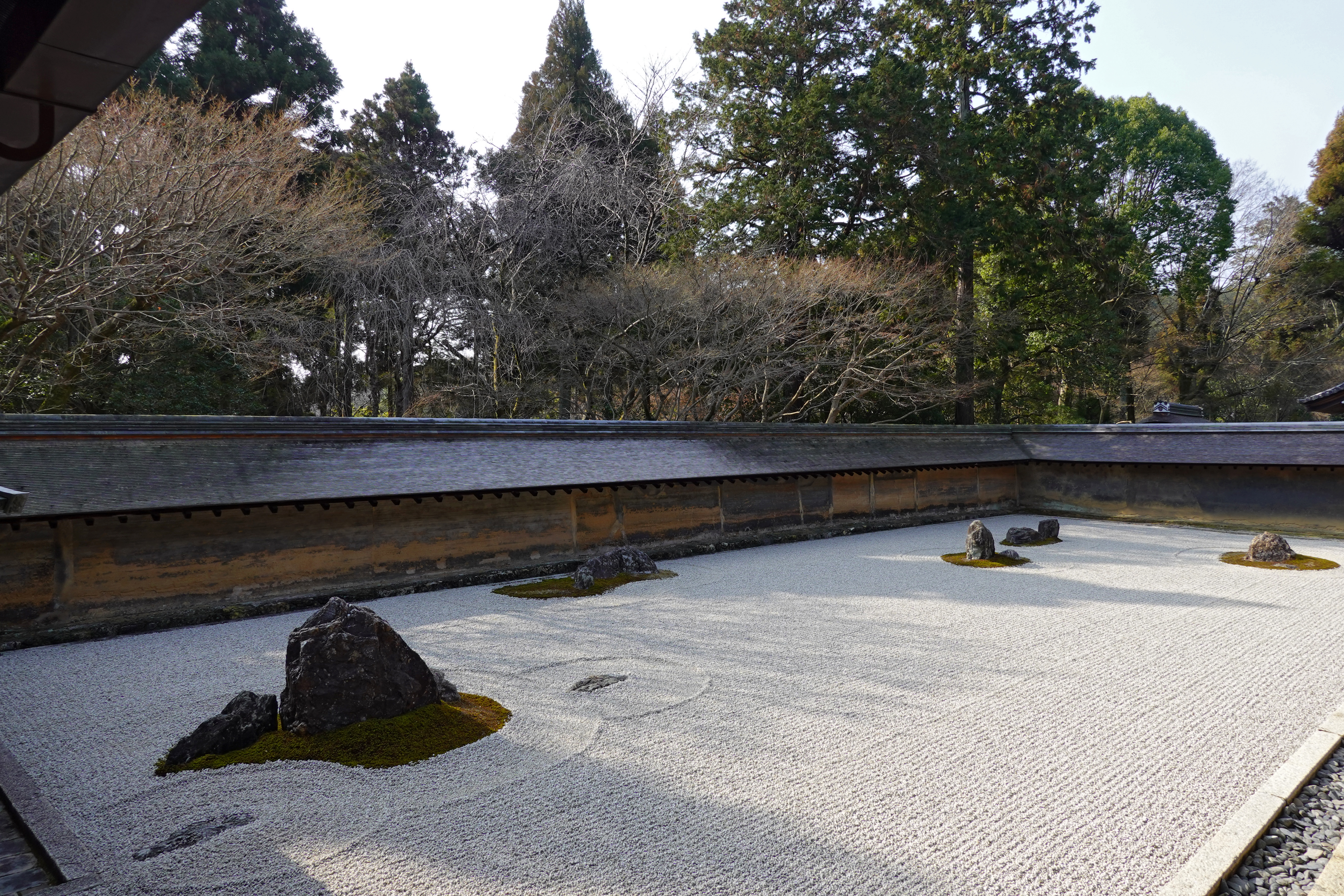
The zen rock garden of Ryōan-ji (late 15th century)

The weakness of the emperors and the rivalry of feudal warlords resulted in two civil wars (1156 and 1159), which destroyed most of Kyoto and its gardens. The capital moved to Kamakura, and then in 1336 back to the Muromachi quarter of Kyoto. The emperors ruled in name only; real power was held by a military governor, the shōgun. During this period, the government reopened relations with China, which had been broken off almost three hundred years earlier. Japanese monks went again to study in China, and Chinese monks came to Japan, fleeing the Mongol invasions. The monks brought with them a new form of Buddhism, called simply Zen, or "meditation". Japan enjoyed a renaissance in religion, in the arts, and particularly in gardens. The term Zen garden appears in English writing in the 1930s for the first time, in Japan zen teien, or zenteki teien comes up even later, from the 1950s. It applies to a Song China-inspired composition technique derived from ink-painting. The composition or construction of such small, scenic gardens have no relation to religious Zen.

Many famous temple gardens were built early in this period, including Kinkaku-ji, the Golden Pavilion, built in 1398, and Ginkaku-ji, the Silver Pavilion, built in 1482. In some ways they followed Zen principles of spontaneity, extreme simplicity and moderation, but in other ways they were traditional Chinese Song-dynasty temples; the upper floors of the Golden Pavilion were covered with gold leaf, and they were surrounded by traditional water gardens.

The most notable garden style invented in this period was the Zen garden, dry garden, or Japanese rock garden. One of the finest examples, and one of the best-known of all Japanese gardens is Ryōan-ji in Kyoto. This garden is just 9 metres (30 ft) wide and 24 metres (79 ft) long, composed of white sand carefully raked to suggest water, and fifteen rocks carefully arranged, like small islands. It is meant to be seen from a seated position on the porch of the residence the abbot of the monastery. There have been many debates about what the rocks are supposed to represent, but, as garden historian Gunter Nitschke wrote, "The garden at Ryōan-ji does not symbolize. It does not have the value of representing any natural beauty that can be found in the world, real or mythical. I consider it as an abstract composition of "natural" objects in space, a composition whose function is to incite mediation."

Several of the famous Zen gardens of Kyoto were the work of one man, Musō Soseki (1275–1351). He was a monk, a ninth-generation descendant of the Emperor Uda and a formidable court politician, writer and organizer, who armed and financed ships to open trade with China, and founded an organization called the Five Mountains, made up of the most powerful Zen monasteries in Kyoto. He was responsible for the building of the zen gardens of Nanzen-ji, Saihō-ji (the Moss Garden), and Tenryū-ji.

Notable gardens of the Kamakura and Muromachi periods include:

- Kinkaku-ji (the Golden Pavilion)
- Ginkaku-ji (the Silver Pavilion)
- Nanzen-ji
- Saihō-ji (the Moss Garden)
- Tenryū-ji
- Daisen-in
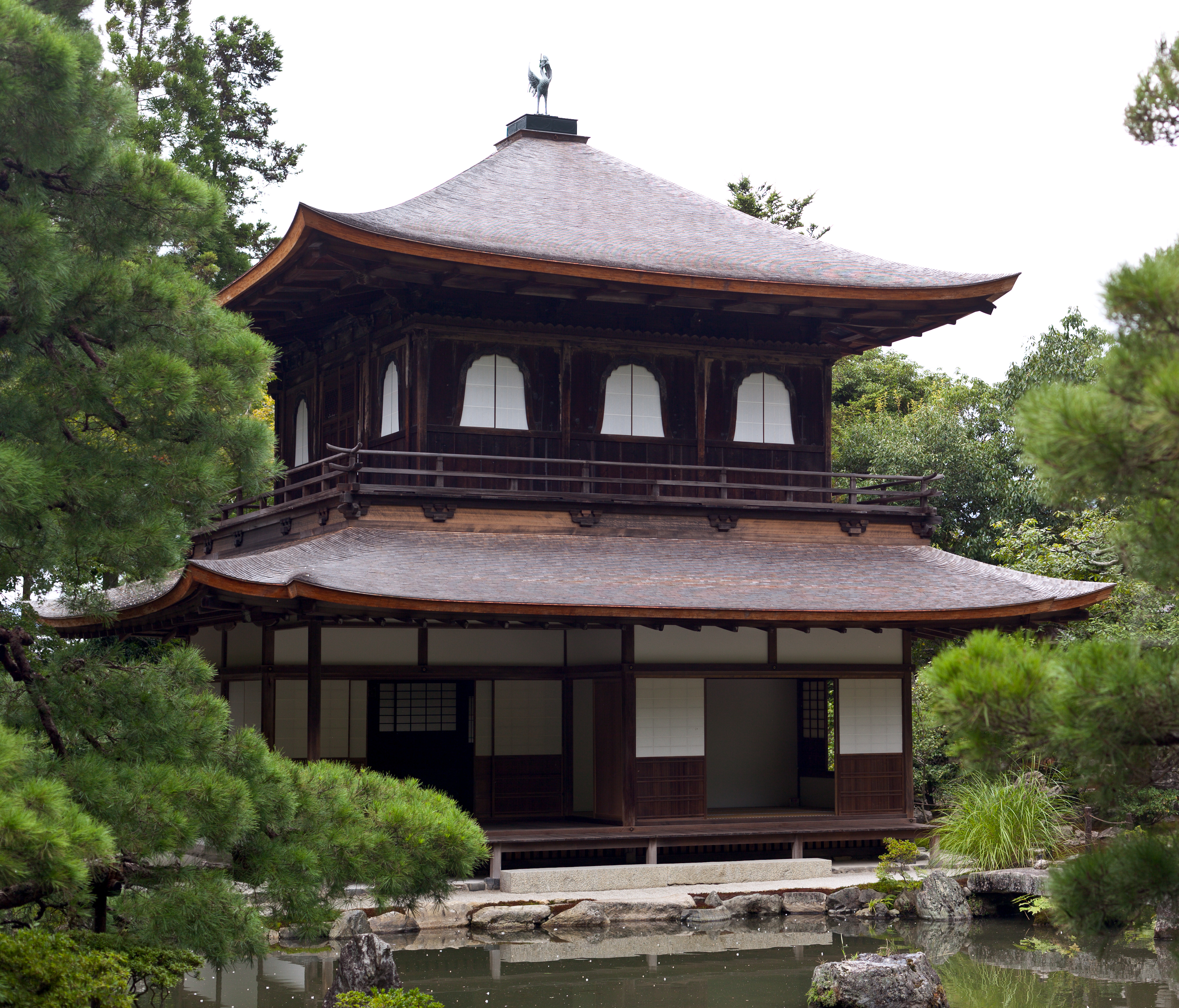
Ginkaku-ji, or the Silver Pavilion, in Kyoto, a Zen Buddhist temple (1482)

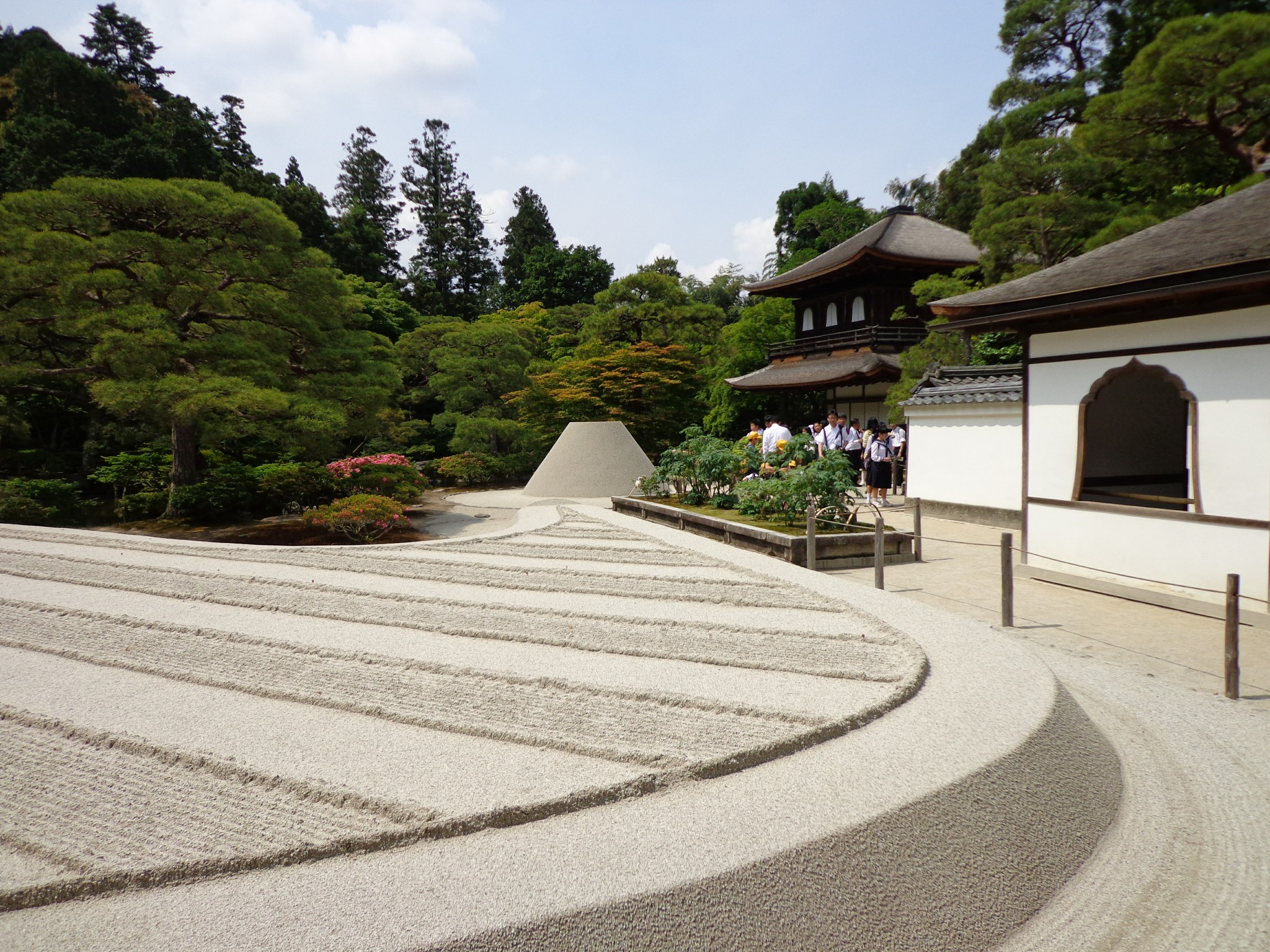
The Zen rock garden of Ginkaku-ji features a miniature mountain shaped like Mount Fuji.

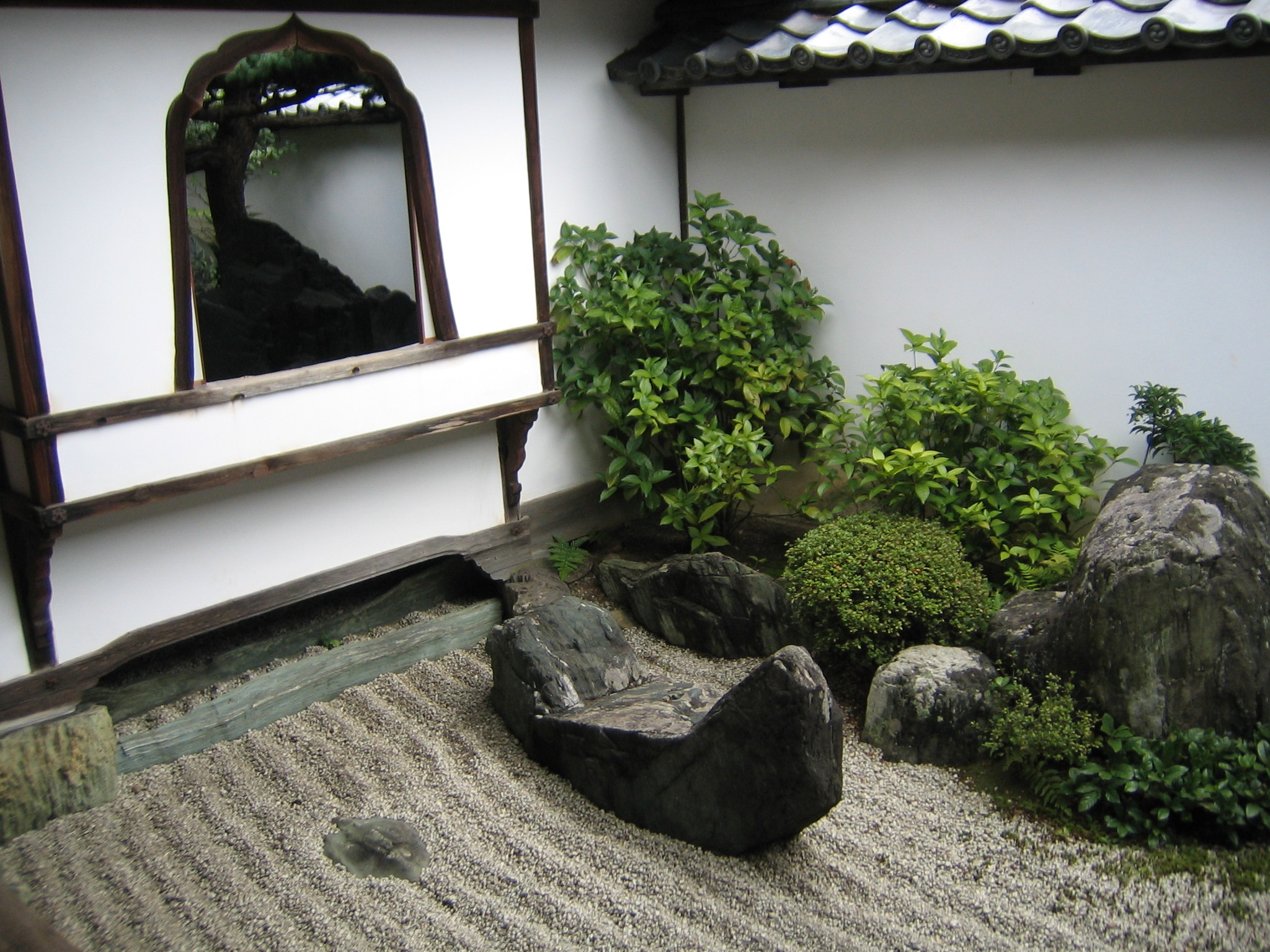
The garden of Daisen-in Kyoto (1513)

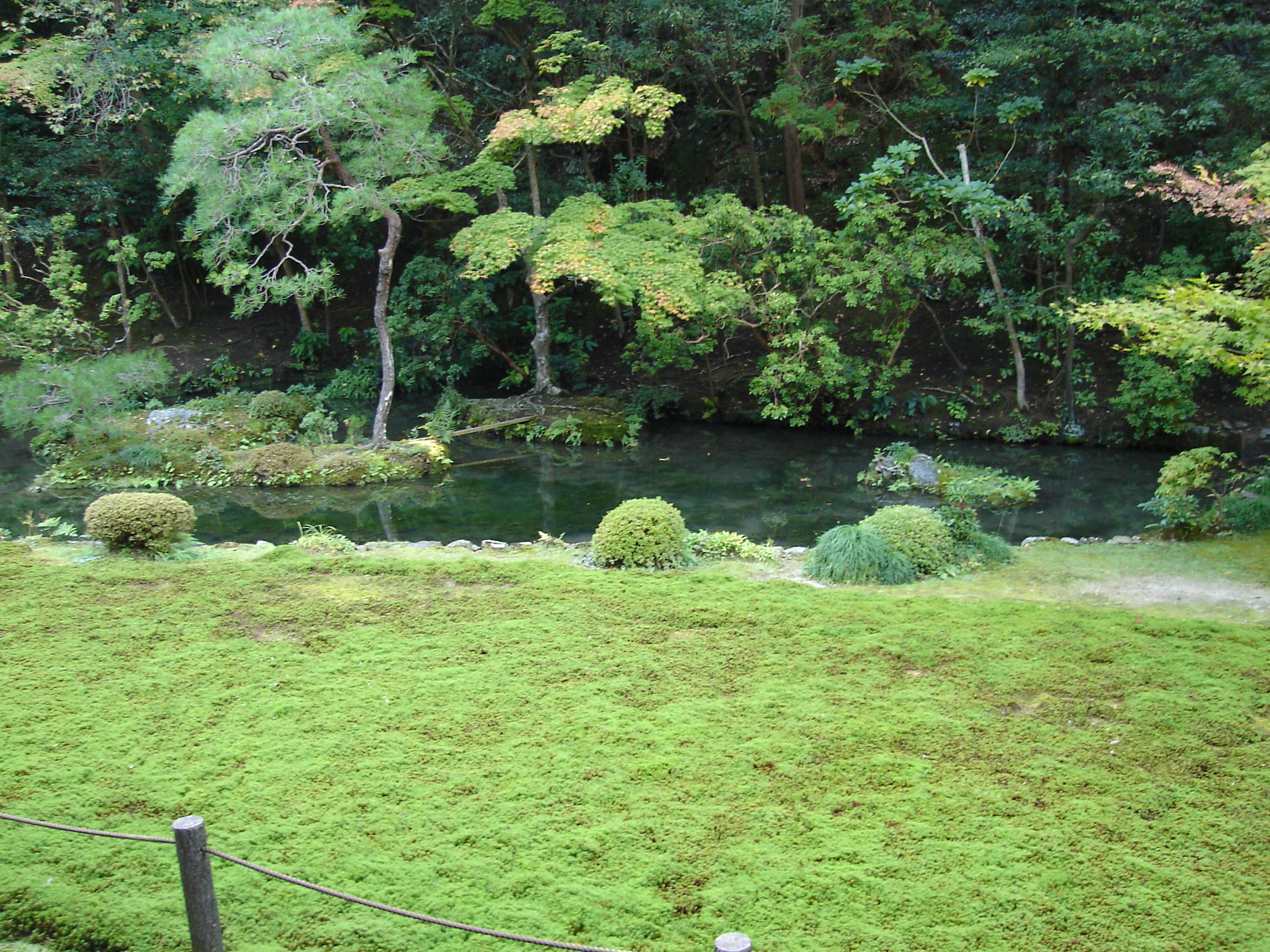
Nanzen-ji garden, Kyoto, built by Musō Soseki. Not all Zen gardens were made of rock and sand; monks here contemplated a forest scene.

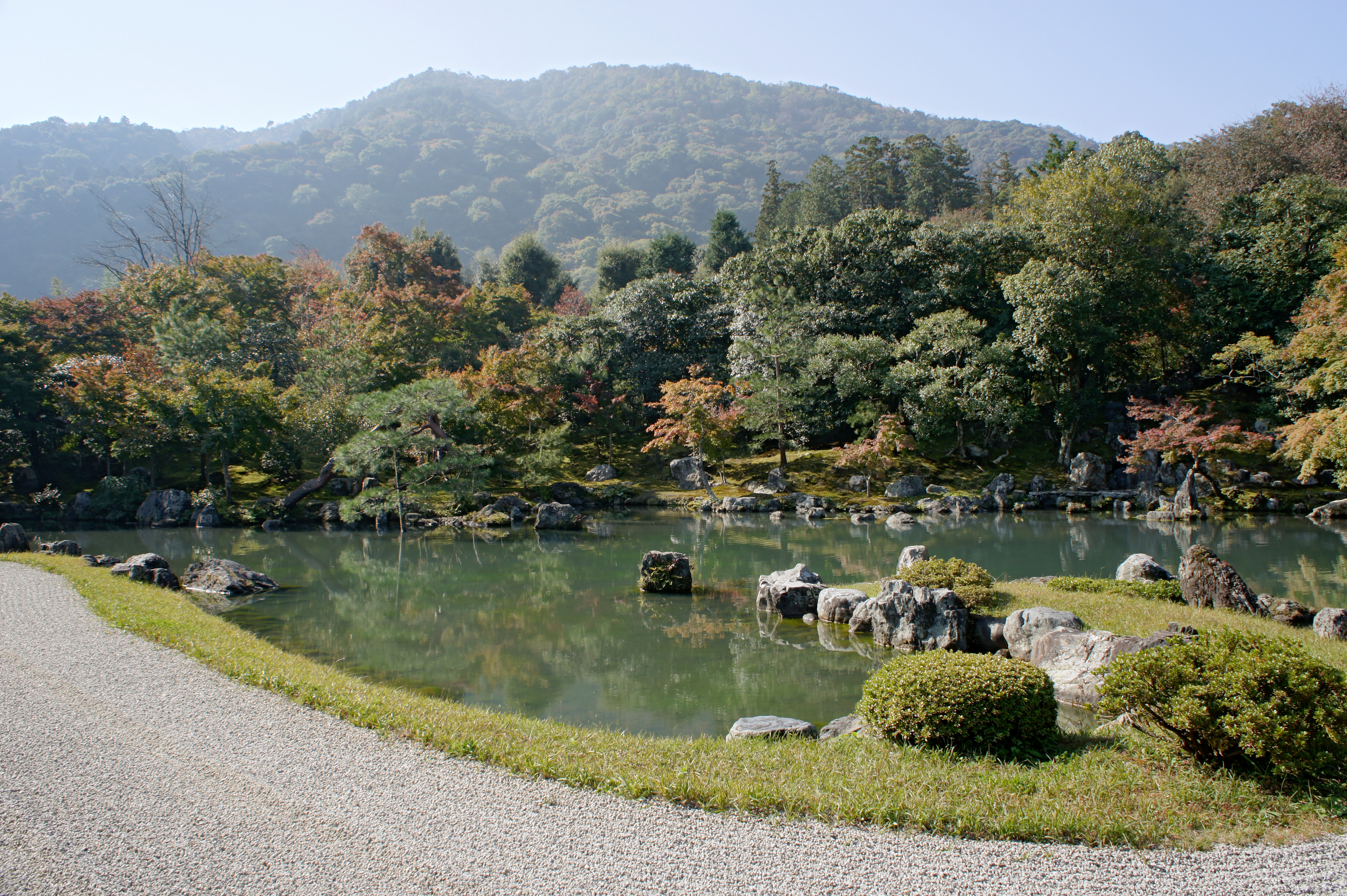
Tenryū-ji garden in Kyoto. The Sogen pond, created by Musō Soseki, is one of the few surviving features of the original garden.

=== Momoyama period (1568–1600) ===
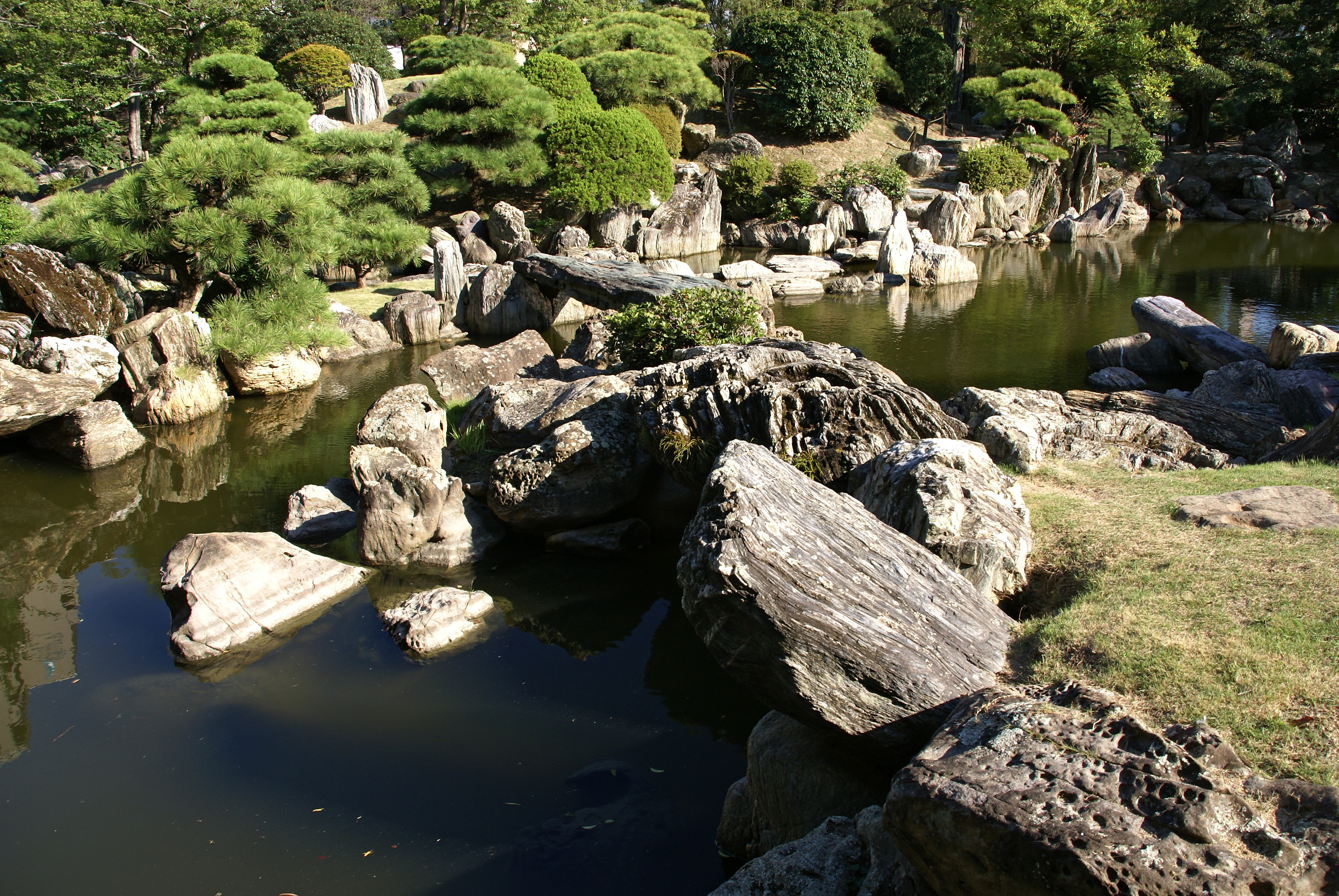
The garden at Tokushima Castle (1592) on the island of Shikoku features water and enormous rocks. It was meant to be seen from above, from a viewing pavilion.

The Momoyama period was short, just 32 years, and was largely occupied with the wars between the daimyō, the leaders of the feudal Japanese clans. The new centers of power and culture in Japan were the fortified castles of the daimyō, around which new cities and gardens appeared. The characteristic garden of the period featured one or more ponds or lakes next to the main residence, or shoin, not far from the castle. These gardens were meant to be seen from above, from the castle or residence. The daimyō had developed the skills of cutting and lifting large rocks to build their castles, and they had armies of soldiers to move them. The artificial lakes were surrounded by beaches of small stones and decorated with arrangements of boulders, with natural stone bridges and stepping stones. The gardens of this period combined elements of a promenade garden, meant to be seen from the winding garden paths, with elements of the Zen garden, such as artificial mountains, meant to be contemplated from a distance.

The most famous garden of this kind, built in 1592, is situated near the Tokushima castle on the island of Shikoku. Its notable features include a bridge 10.5 metres (34 ft) long made of two natural stones.

Another notable garden of the period still existing is Sanbō-in, rebuilt by Toyotomi Hideyoshi in 1598 to celebrate the festival of the cherry blossom and to recreate the splendor of an ancient garden. Three hundred garden-builders worked on the project, digging the lakes and installing seven hundred boulders in a space of 540 square metres (5,800 sq ft). The garden was designed to be seen from the veranda of the main pavilion, or from the "Hall of the Pure View", located on a higher elevation in the garden.

In the east of the garden, on a peninsula, is an arrangement of stones designed to represent the mythical Mount Horai. A wooden bridge leads to an island representing a crane, and a stone bridge connects this island to another representing a tortoise, which is connected by an earth-covered bridge back to the peninsula. The garden also includes a waterfall at the foot of a wooded hill. One characteristic of the Momoyama period garden visible at Sanbō-in is the close proximity of the buildings to the water.

The Momoyama period also saw the development of chanoyu (tea ceremony), the chashitsu (teahouse), and the roji (tea garden). Tea had been introduced to Japan from China by Buddhist monks, who used it as a stimulant to keep awake during long periods of meditation. The first great tea master, Sen no Rikyū (1522–1591), defined in the most minute detail the appearance and rules of the tea house and tea garden, following the principle of wabi (侘び, "sober refinement and calm").

Following Sen no Rikyū's rules, the teahouse was supposed to suggest the cottage of a hermit-monk. It was a small and very plain wooden structure, often with a thatched roof, with just enough room inside for two tatami mats. The only decoration allowed inside a scroll with an inscription and a branch of a tree. It did not have a view of the garden.

The garden was also small, and constantly watered to be damp and green. It usually had a cherry tree or elm to bring color in the spring, but otherwise did not have bright flowers or exotic plants that would distract the attention of the visitor. A path led to the entrance of the teahouse. Along the path was waiting bench for guests and a privy, and a stone water-basin near the teahouse, where the guests rinsed their hands and mouths before entering the tea room through a small, square door called nijiri-guchi, or "crawling-in entrance", which requires bending low to pass through. Sen no Rikyū decreed that the garden should be left unswept for several hours before the ceremony, so that leaves would be scattered in a natural way on the path.

Notable gardens of the period include:

- Tokushima Castle garden on the island of Shikoku.
- Tai-an tea house at Myōki-an Temple in Kyoto, built in 1582 by Sen no Rikyū.
- Sanbō-in at Daigo-ji, in Kyoto Prefecture (1598)
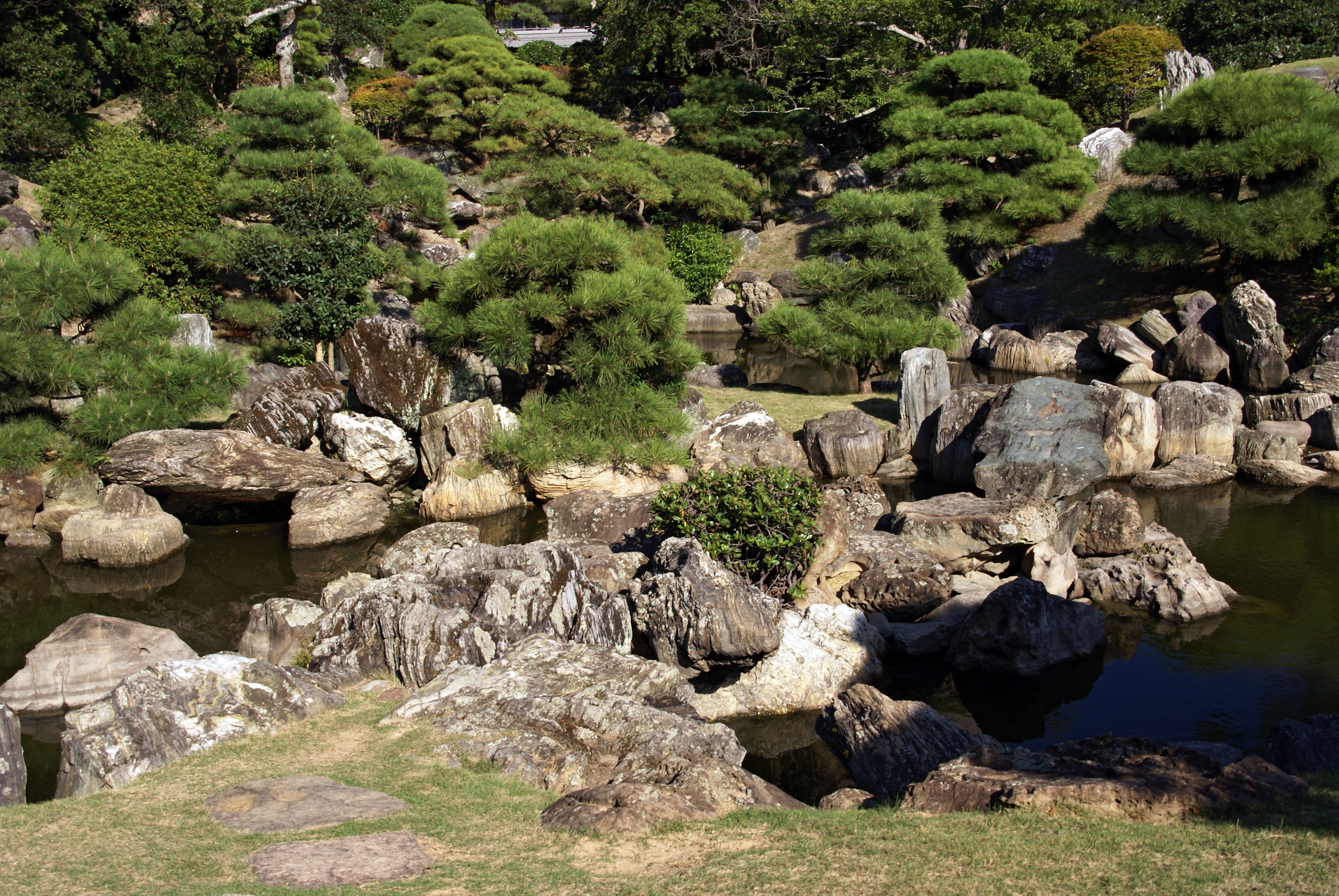
Garden at the Tokushima Castle, dominated by rocks

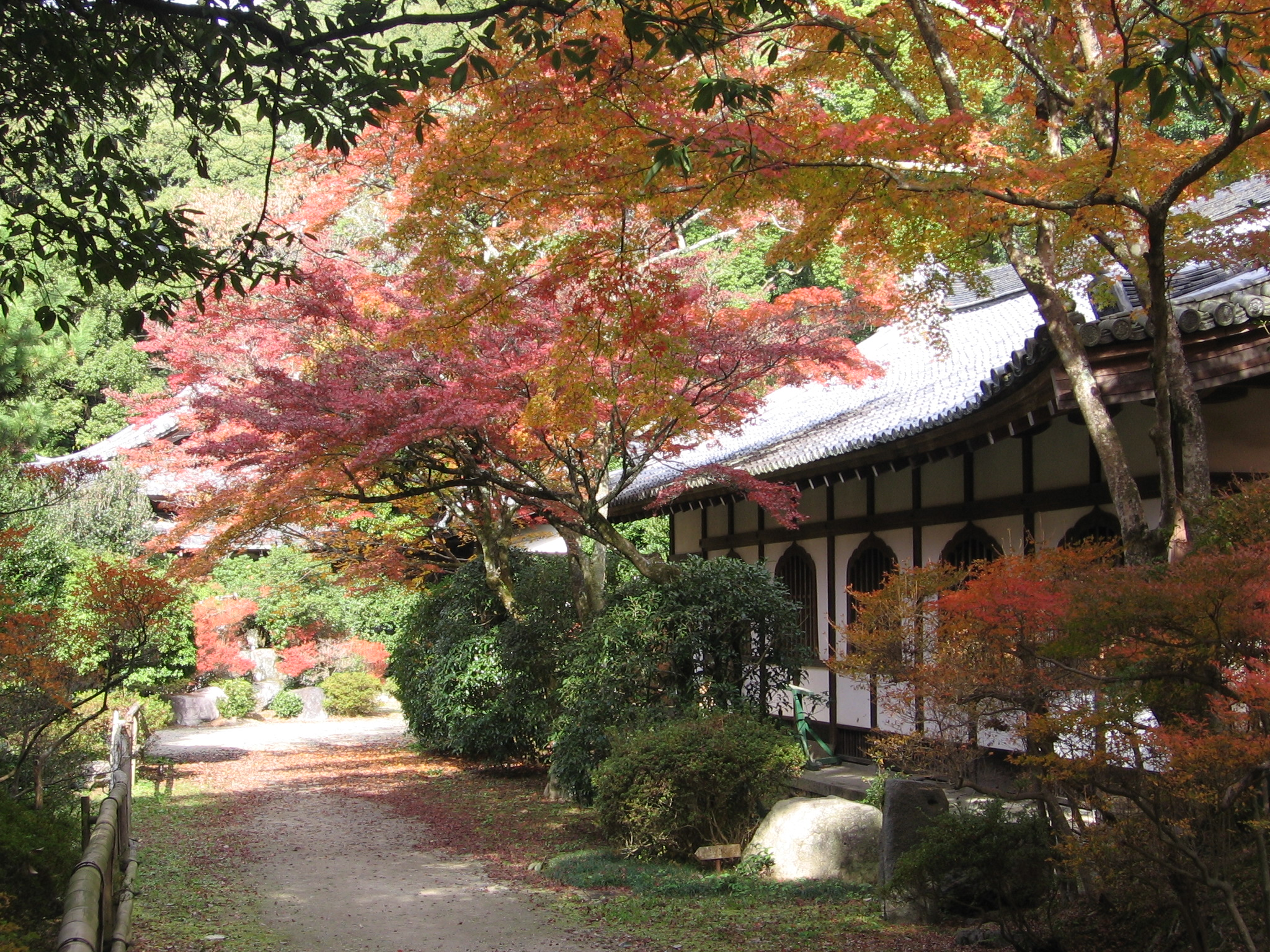
The garden at Daigo-ji (1598) is famous for its cherry blossoms.

=== Edo period (1615–1867) ===
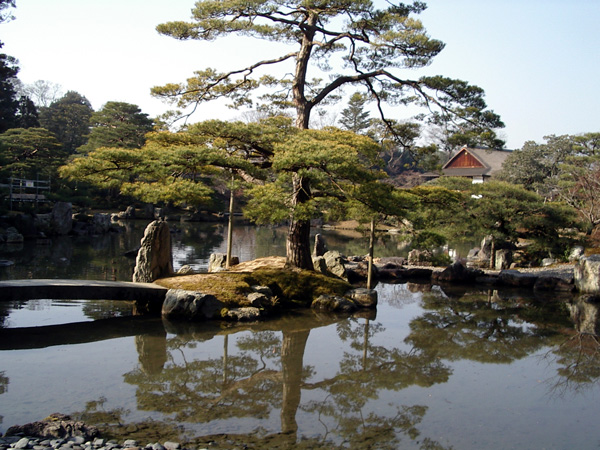
The garden of Katsura Imperial Villa in Kyoto (1641–1662), the prototype for the promenade, or stroll garden

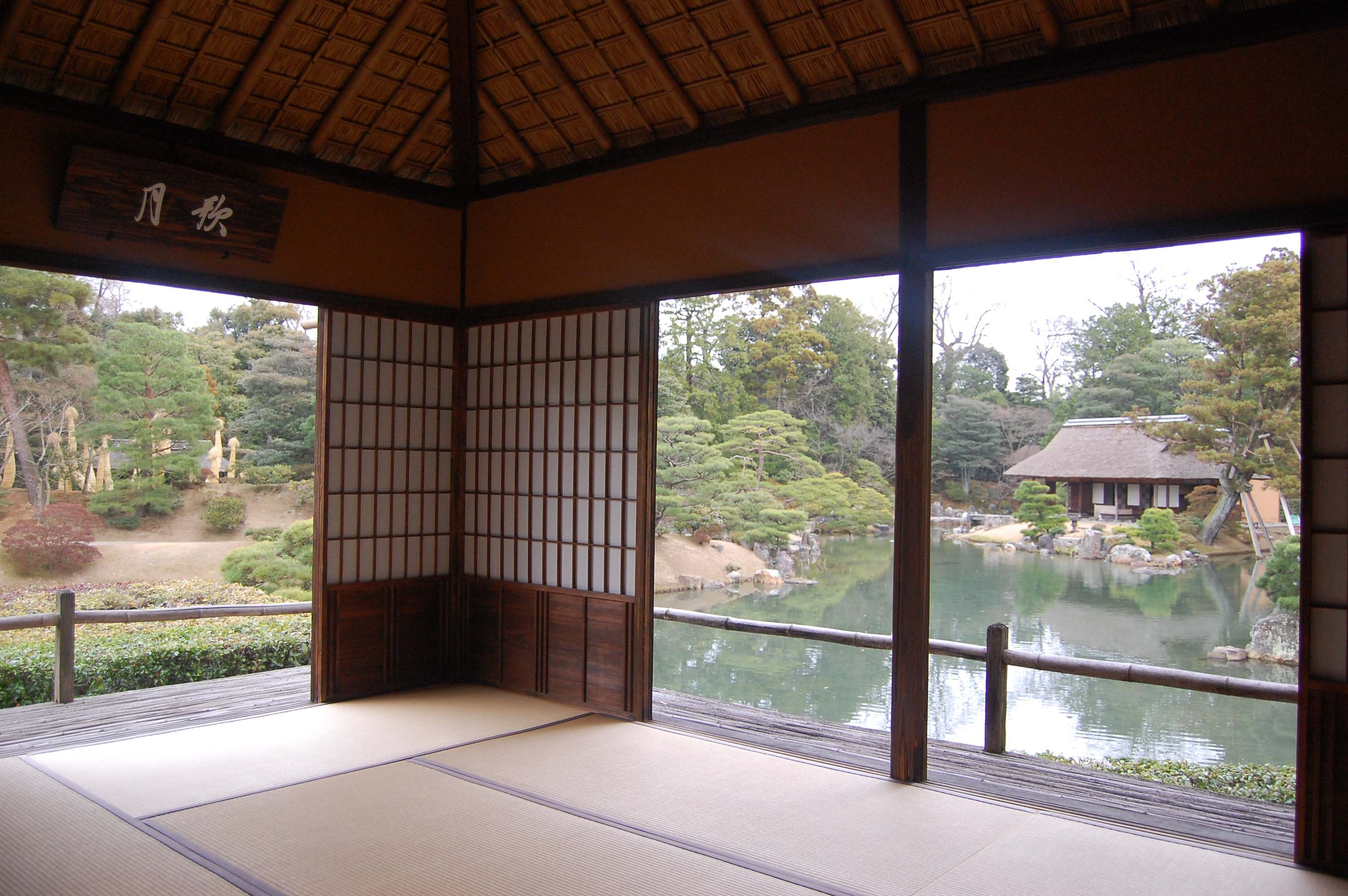
The interior of the Geppa Pavilion of the Katsura Imperial Villa, perfectly integrated into the garden

During the Edo period, power was won and consolidated by the Tokugawa clan, who became the shōgun, and moved the capital to Edo, which became Tokyo. The emperor remained in Kyoto as a figurehead leader, with authority only over cultural and religious affairs. While the political center of Japan was now Tokyo, Kyoto remained the cultural capital, the center for religion and art. The shōgun provided the emperors with little power, but with generous subsidies for building gardens.

The Edo period saw the widespread use of a new kind of Japanese architecture, called sukiya-zukuri, which means literally "building according to chosen taste". The term first appeared at the end of the 16th century referring to isolated tea houses. It originally applied to the simple country houses of samurai warriors and Buddhist monks, but in the Edo period it was used in every kind of building, from houses to palaces.

The sukiya style was used in the most famous garden of the period, the Katsura Imperial Villa in Kyoto. The buildings were built in a very simple, undecorated style, a prototype for future Japanese architecture. They opened up onto the garden, so that the garden seemed entirely part of the building; whether the visitor was inside or outside of the building, they would ideally always feel they were in the center of nature. The garden buildings were arranged so that were always seen from a diagonal, rather than straight on. This arrangement had the poetic name ganko, which meant literally "a formation of wild geese in flight".

Most of the gardens of the Edo period were either promenade gardens or dry rock Zen gardens, and they were usually much larger than earlier gardens. The promenade gardens of the period made extensive use of borrowed scenery (shakkei). Vistas of distant mountains are integrated in the design of the garden; or, even better, building the garden on the side of a mountain and using the different elevations to attain views over landscapes outside the garden. Edo promenade gardens were often composed of a series of meisho, or "famous views", similar to postcards. These could be imitations of famous natural landscapes, like Mount Fuji, or scenes from Taoist or Buddhist legends, or landscapes illustrating verses of poetry. Unlike Zen gardens, they were designed to portray nature as it appeared, not the internal rules of nature.

Well-known Edo-period gardens include:

- Shugakuin Imperial Villa
- Shisen-dō (1641)
- Suizen-ji
- Hama Rikyu
- Kōraku-en (Okayama)
- Ritsurin Garden (Takamatsu)
- Koishikawa Kōraku-en (Tokyo) (1629)
- Ninna-ji, Kyoto
- Enman-in, Otsu
- Sanzen-in, north of Kyoto
- Sengan-en, Kagoshima (1658)
- Chishaku-in, southeast of Kyoto
- Jōju-in, in the temple of Kiyomizu, southeast of Kyoto (1688–1703)
- Manshu-in, northeast of Kyoto (1656)
- Nanzen-ji, east of Kyoto (1688–1703)
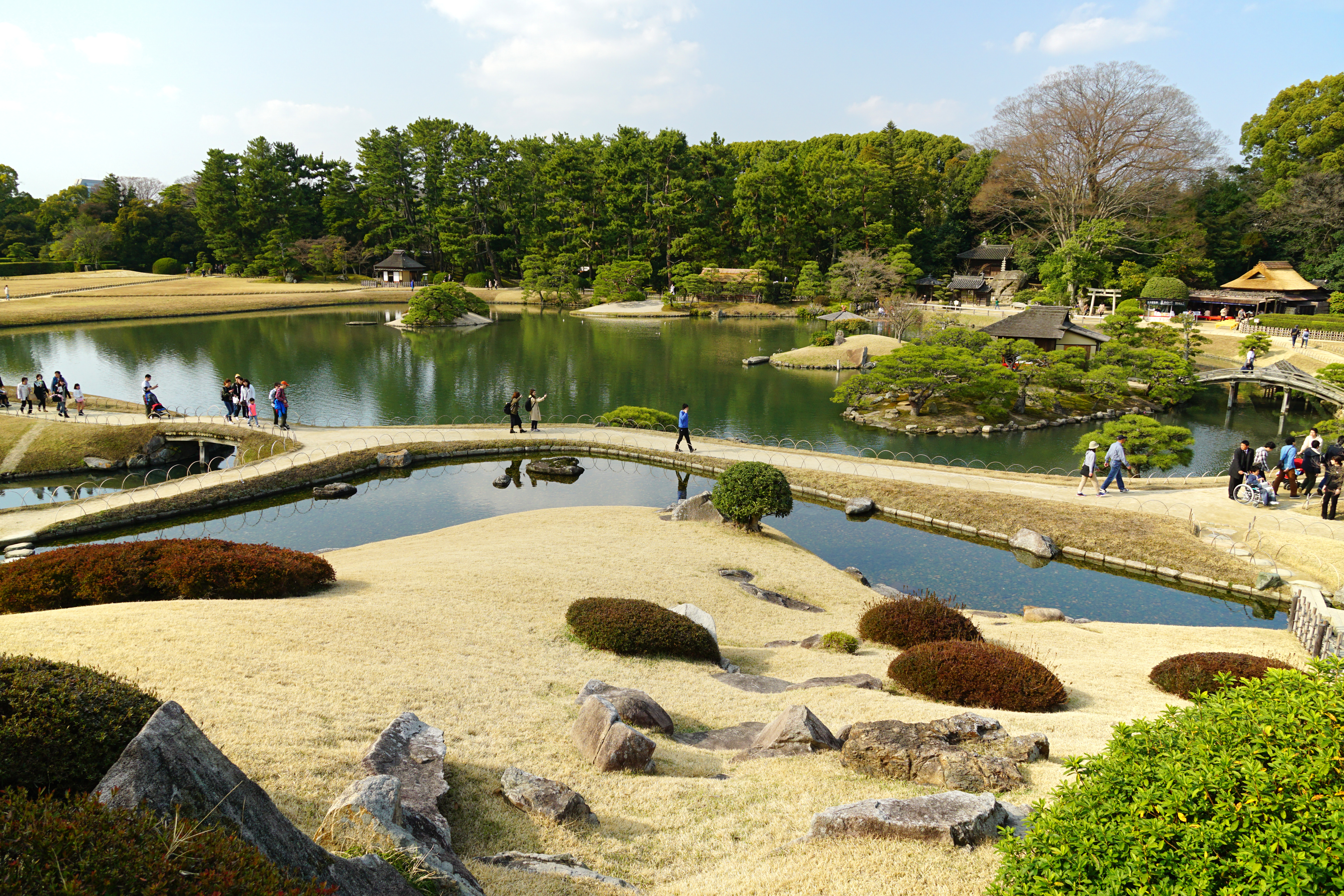
Kōraku-en in Okayama, begun in 1700

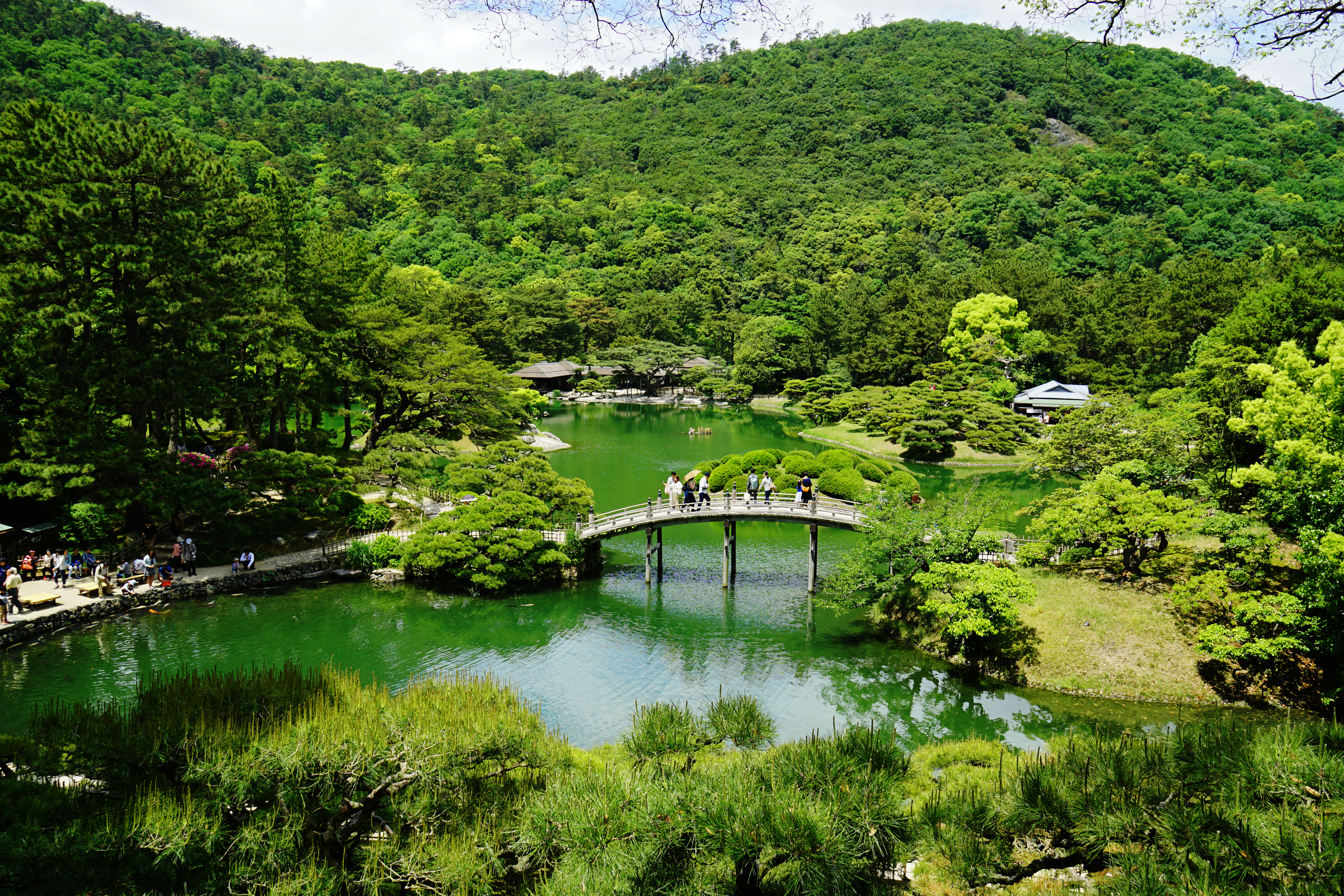
Ritsurin Garden in Takamatsu, begun in 1625

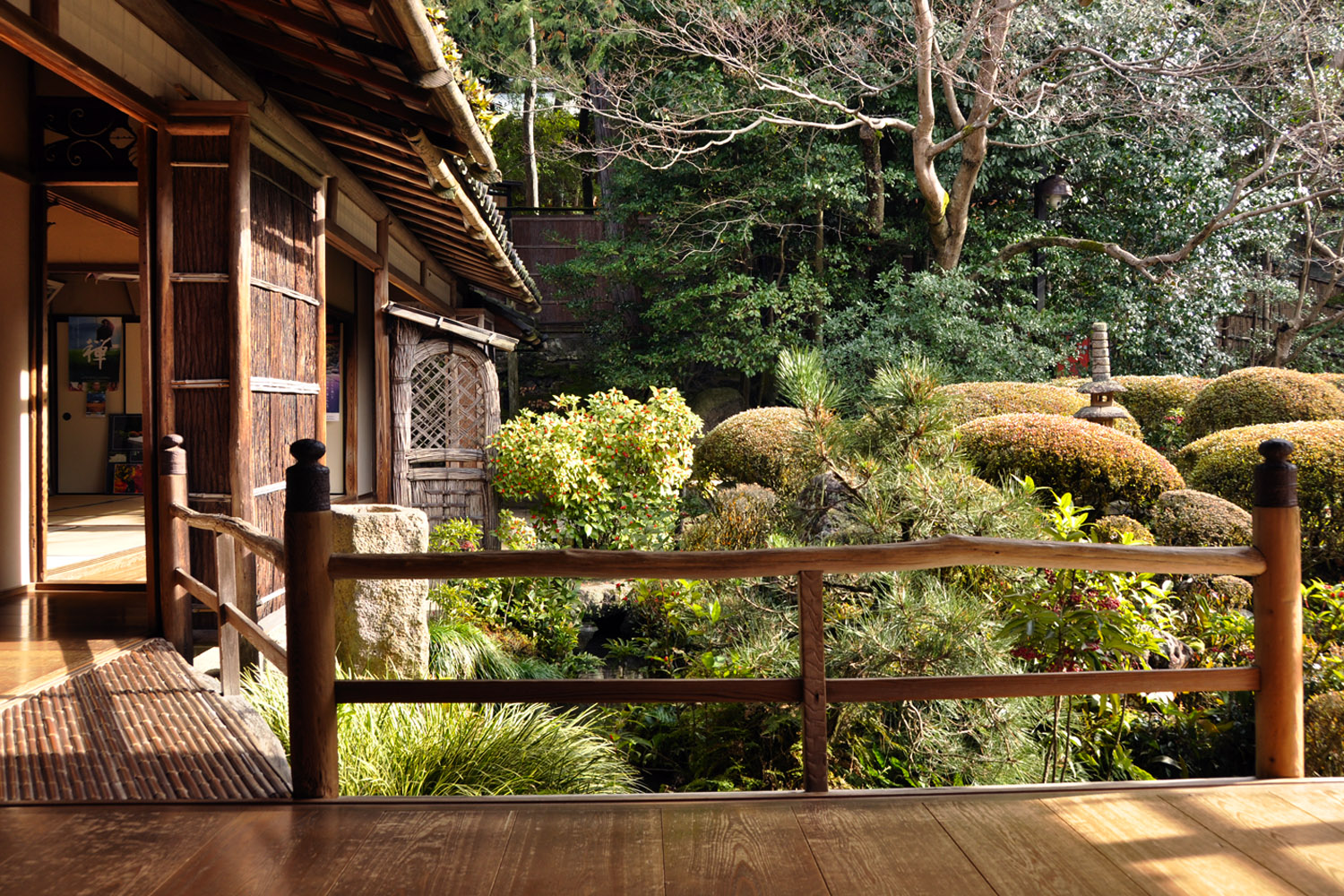
The hermitage garden of the poet and scholar Ishikawa Jozan at Shisen-dō, built in 1641. It later became a temple.

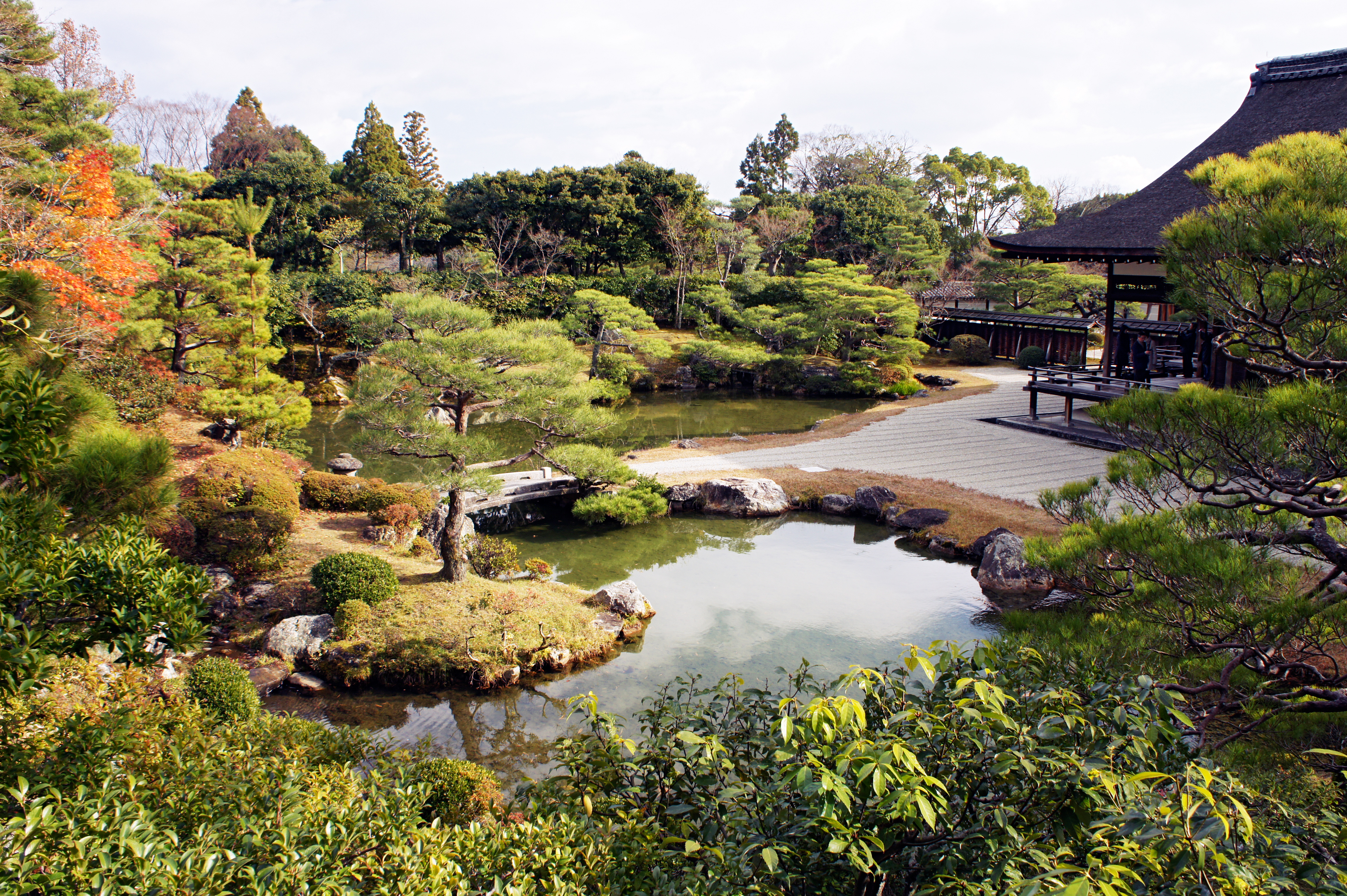
The north garden at Ninna-ji in Kyoto, a classic promenade garden

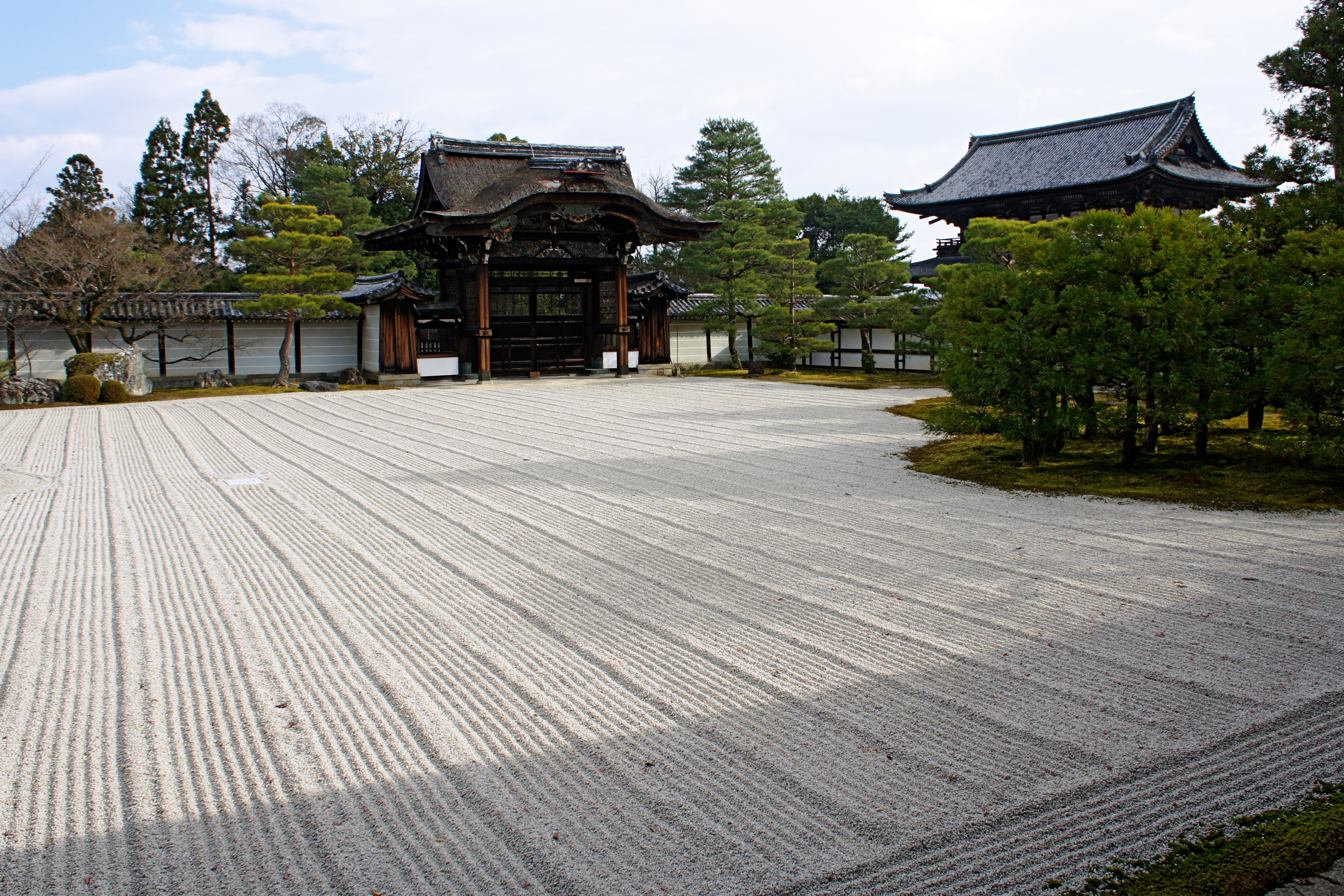
The south garden at Ninna-ji, a Zen rock garden

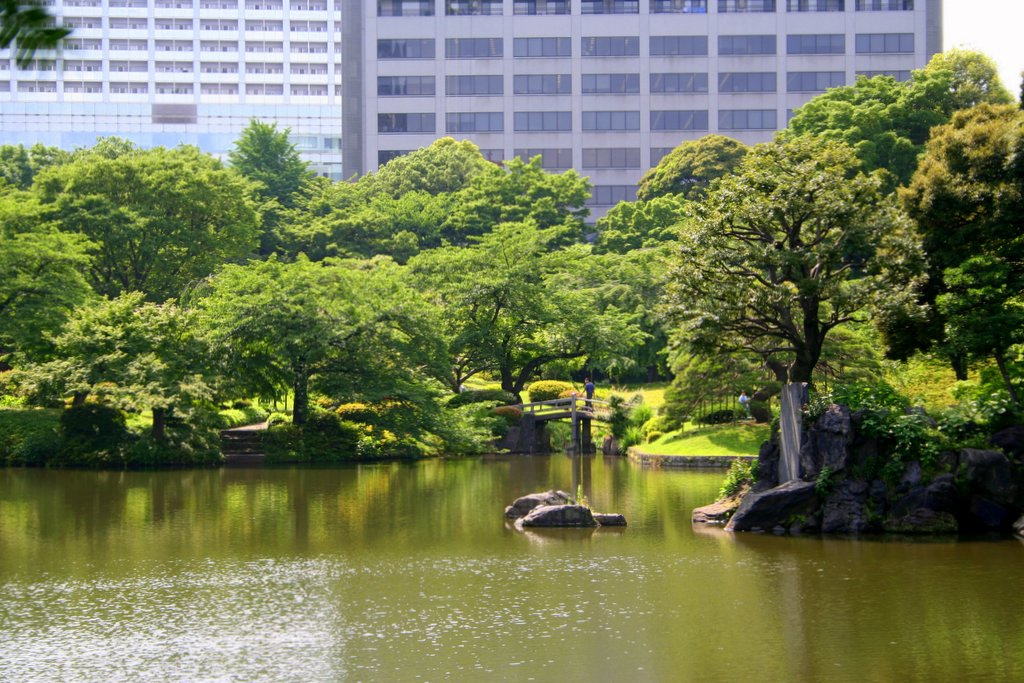
Koishikawa Kōrakuen Garden in Tokyo, begun in 1629, is now surrounded by office buildings.

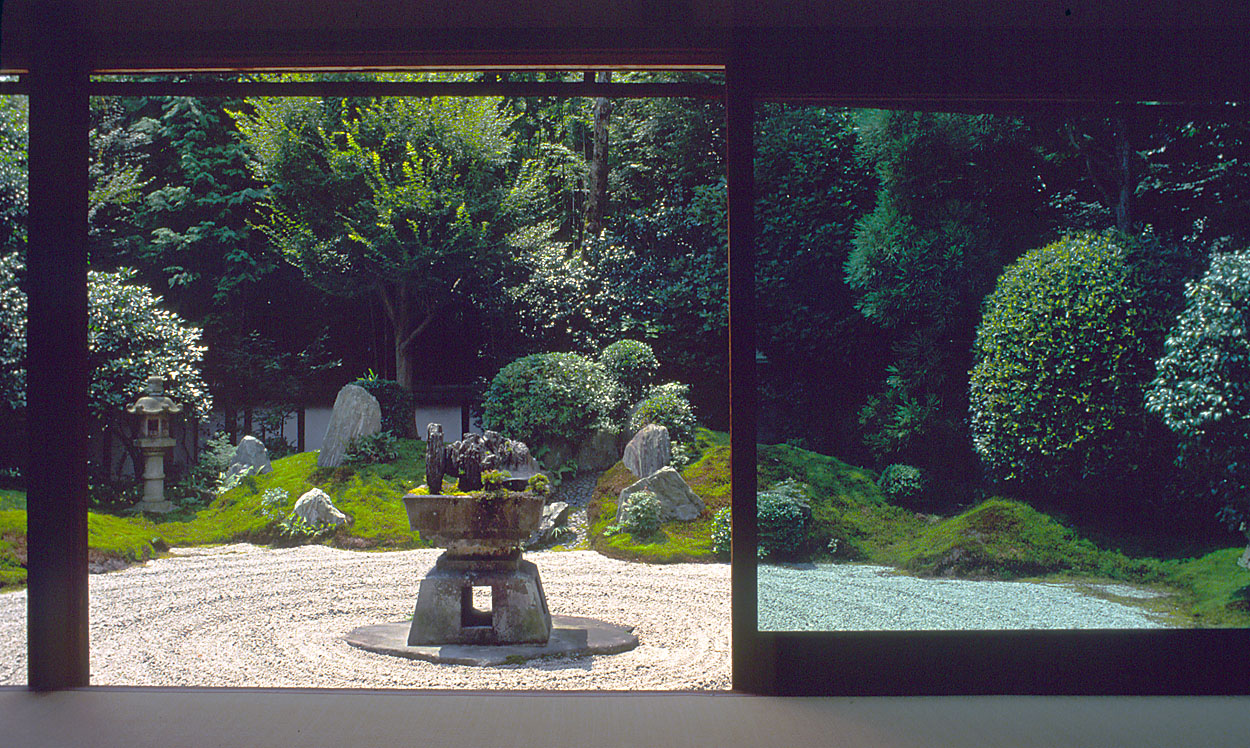
The most famous view of Suizen-ji is a miniature mountain resembling Mount Fuji.

=== Meiji period (1868–1912) ===
The Meiji period saw the modernization of Japan, and the re-opening of Japan to the West. Many of the old private gardens had been abandoned and left to ruin. In 1871, a new law transformed many gardens from the earlier Edo period into public parks, preserving them. Garden designers, confronted with ideas from the West experimented with western styles, leading to such gardens as Kyu-Furukawa Gardens, or Shinjuku Gyoen. Others, more in the north of Japan kept to Edo period blueprint design. A third wave was the naturalistic style of gardens, invented by captains of industry and powerful politicians like Aritomo Yamagata. Many gardeners soon were designing and constructing gardens catering to this taste. One of the gardens well-known for his technical perfection in this style was Ogawa Jihei VII, also known as Ueji.

Notable gardens of this period include:

- Kyu-Furukawa Gardens
- Kenroku-en, 18th and 19th centuries, finished in 1874.
- Chinzan-so in Tokyo in 1877.
- Murin-an in Kyoto, finished 1898.
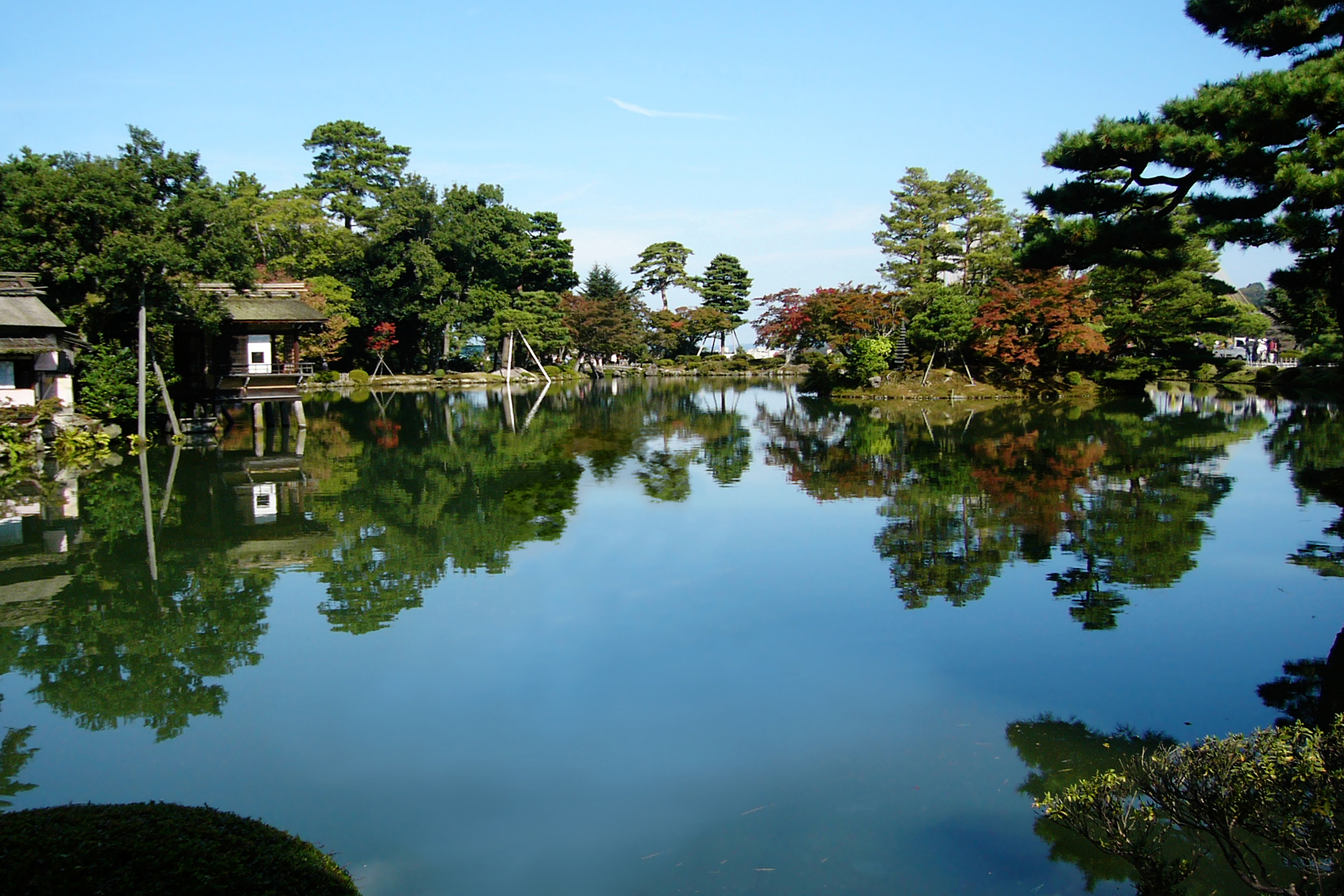
Kenroku-en in Kanazawa

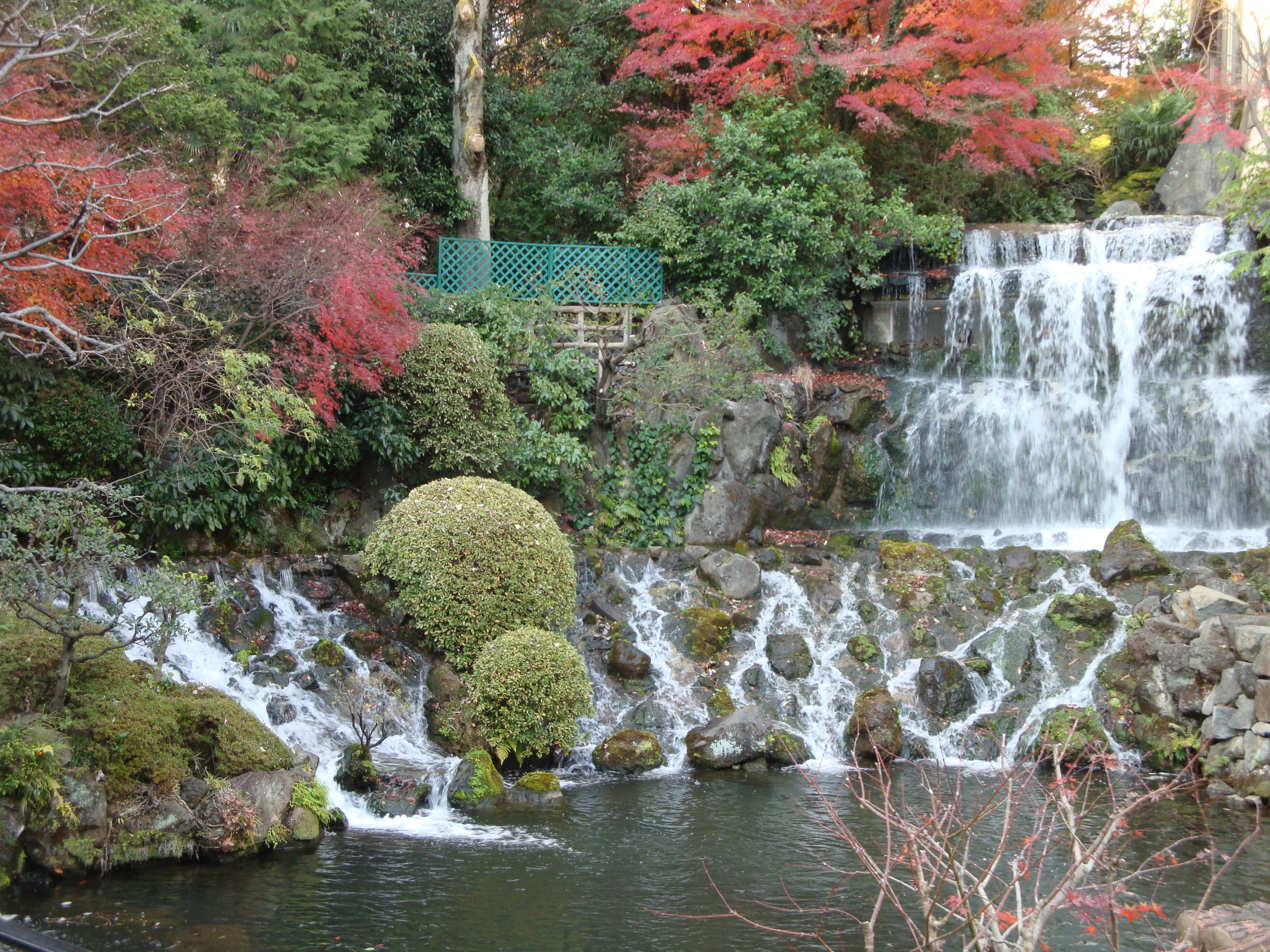
Chinzan-so in Tokyo

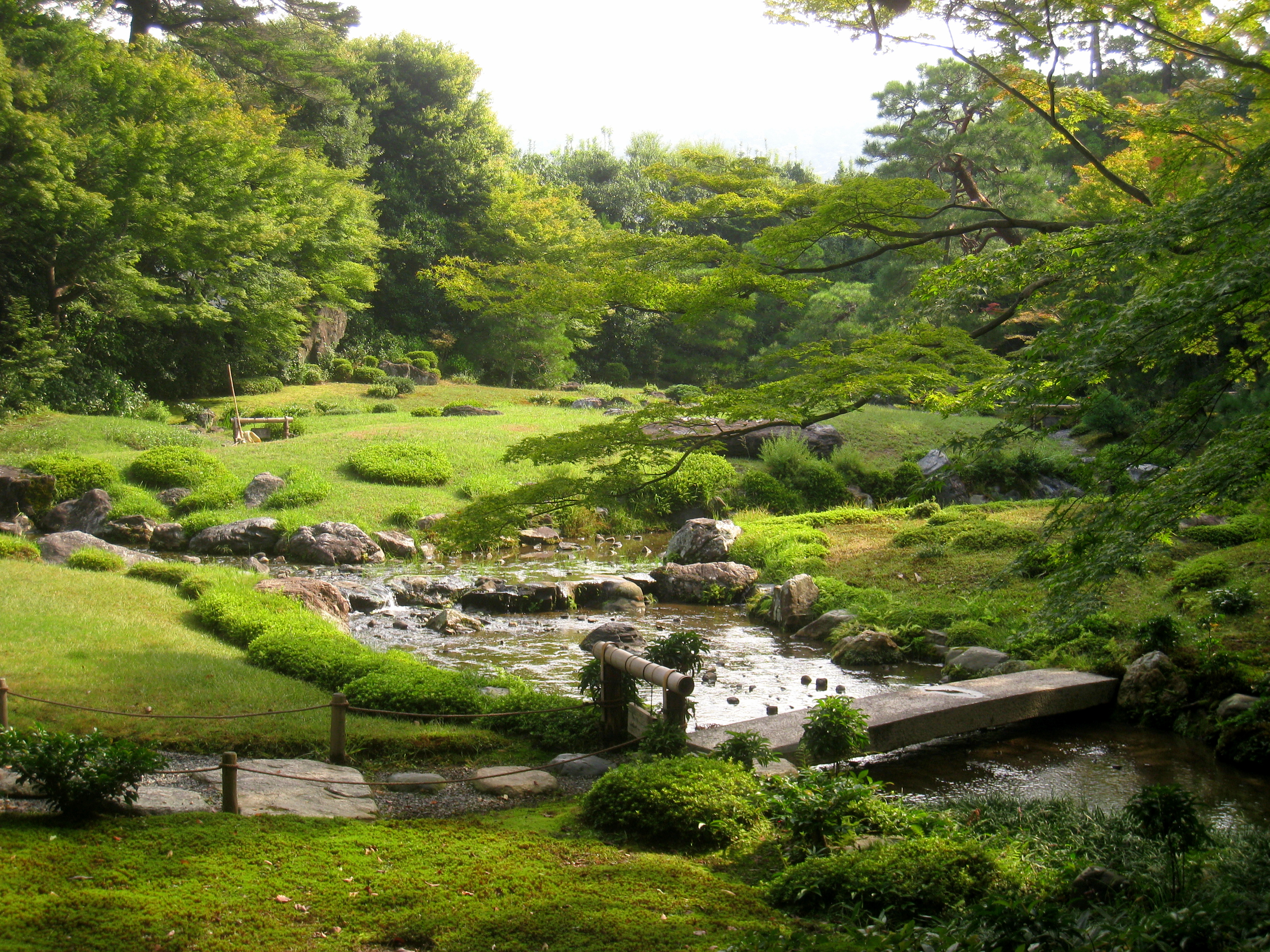
Murin-an in Kyoto

=== Modern Japanese gardens (1912 to present) ===
During the Shōwa period (1926–1989), many traditional gardens were built by businessmen and politicians. After World War II, the principal builders of gardens were no longer private individuals, but banks, hotels, universities and government agencies. The Japanese garden became an extension of the landscape architecture with the building. New gardens were designed by landscape architects, and often used modern building materials such as concrete.

Some modern Japanese gardens, such as Tōfuku-ji, designed by Mirei Shigemori, were inspired by classical models. Other modern gardens have taken a much more radical approach to the traditions. One example is Awaji Yumebutai, a garden on the island of Awaji, in the Seto Inland Sea of Japan, designed by Tadao Ando. It was built as part of a resort and conference center on a steep slope, where land had been stripped away to make an island for an airport.

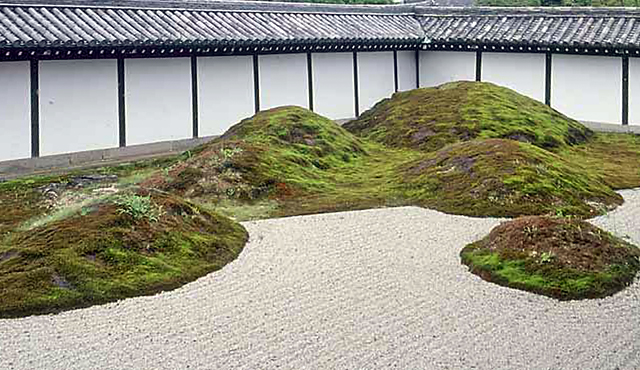
Tōfuku-ji, a modern Japanese garden from 1934, designed by Mirei Shigemori, built on grounds of a 13th-century Zen temple in Kyoto

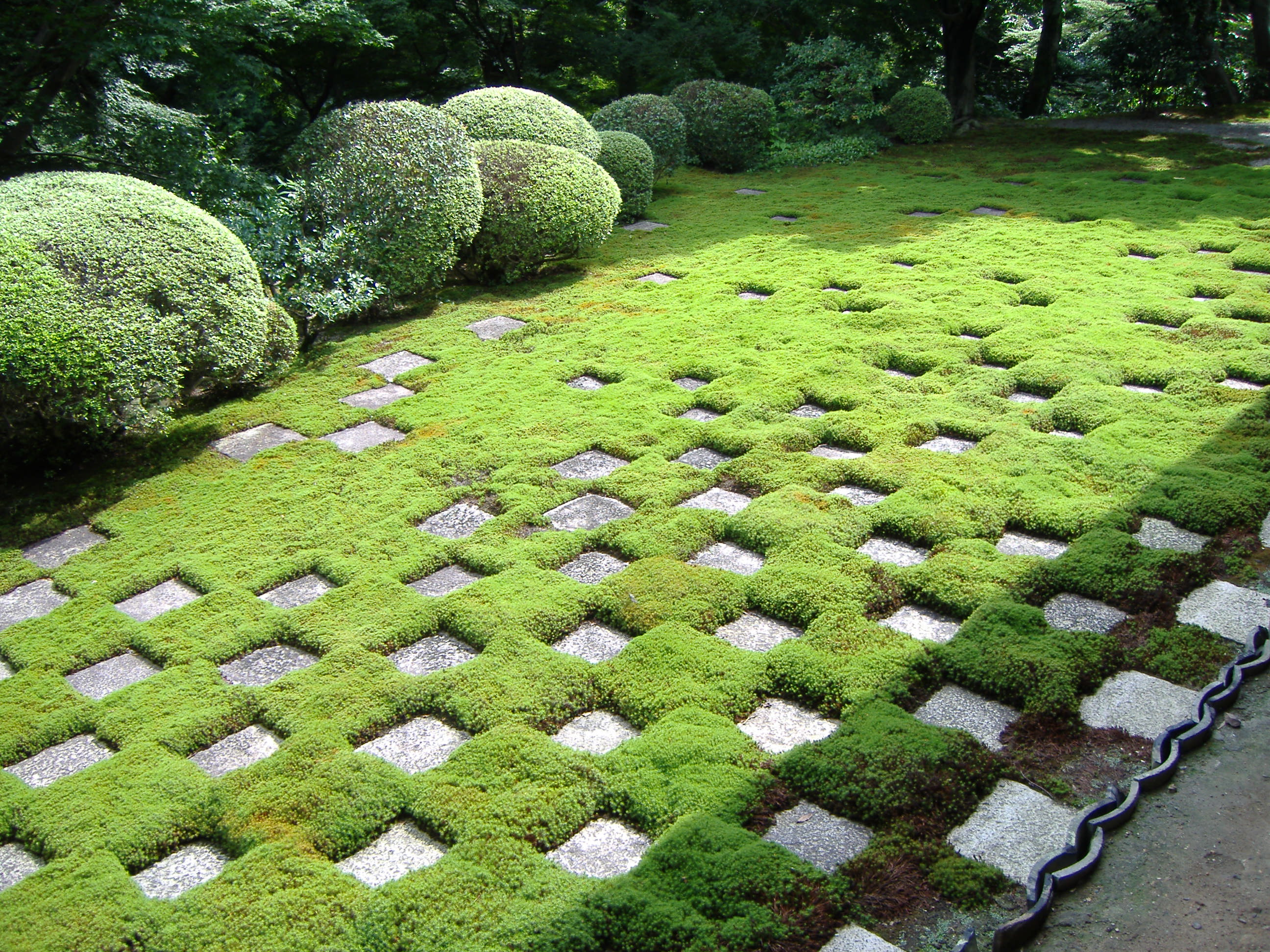
The moss garden at Tōfuku-ji, Kyoto

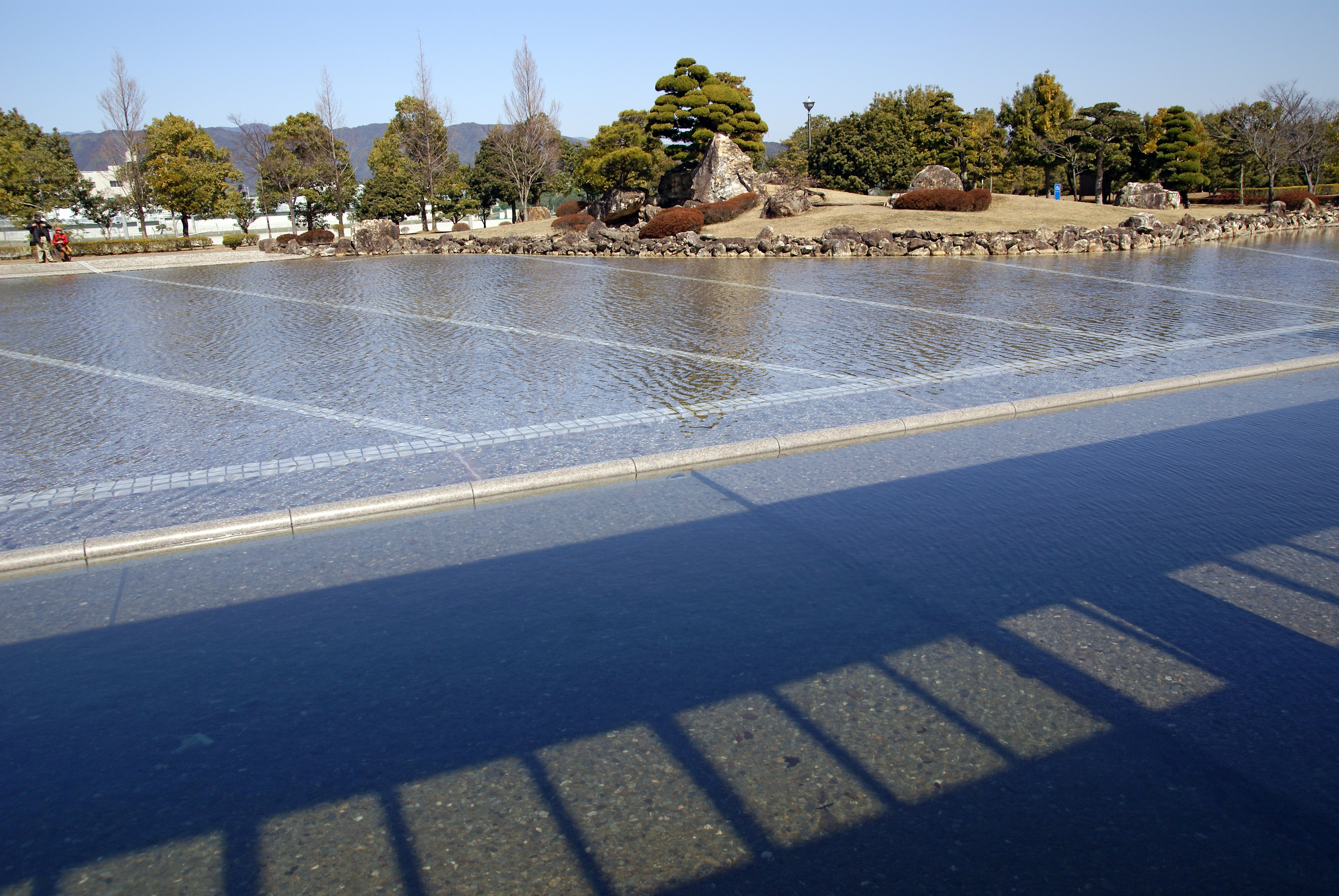
A contemporary Japanese garden at the Kochi Museum of Art

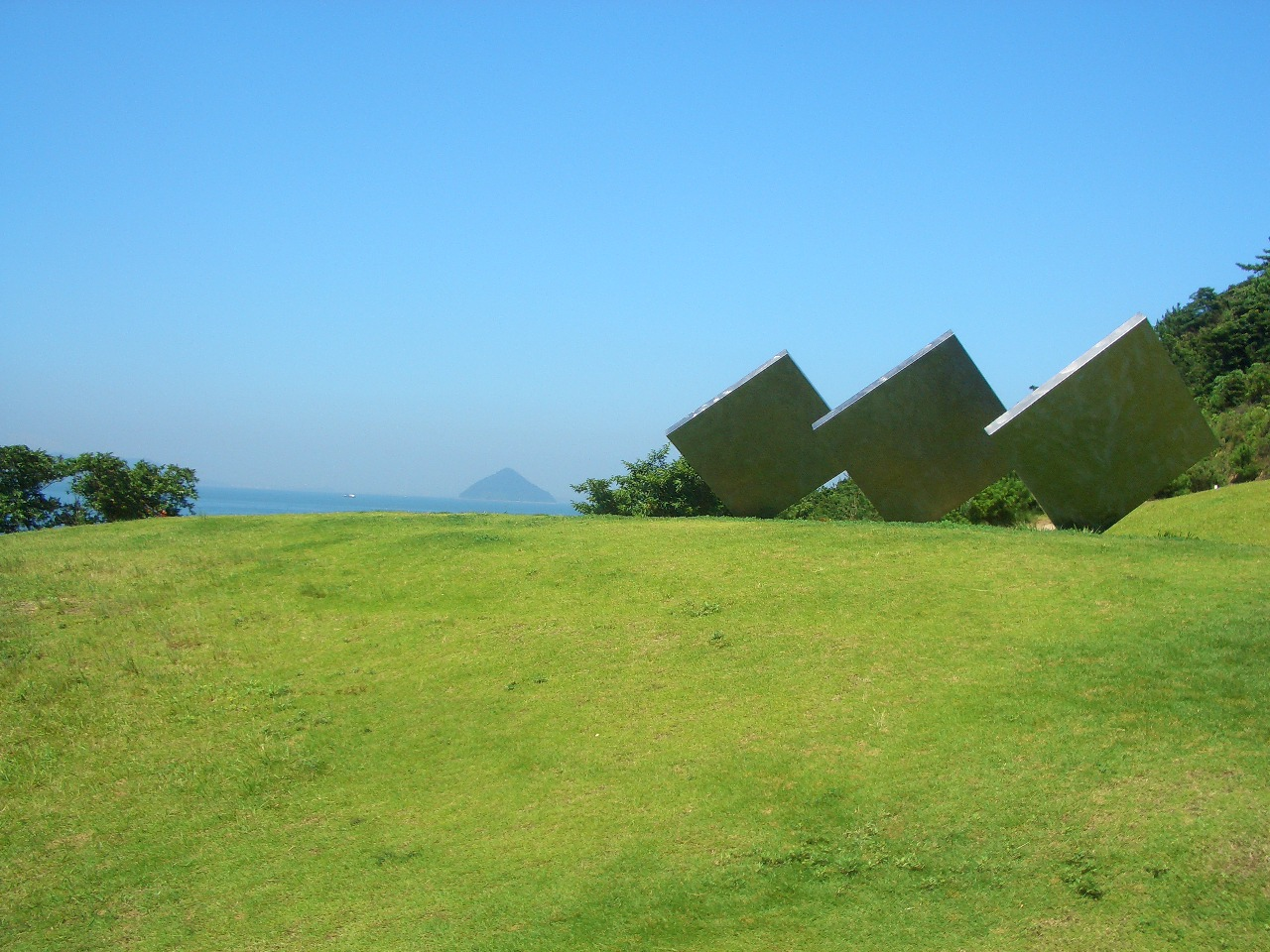
The garden at the Naoshima Fukutake Art Museum, using sculpture to imitate the form of island on the horizon

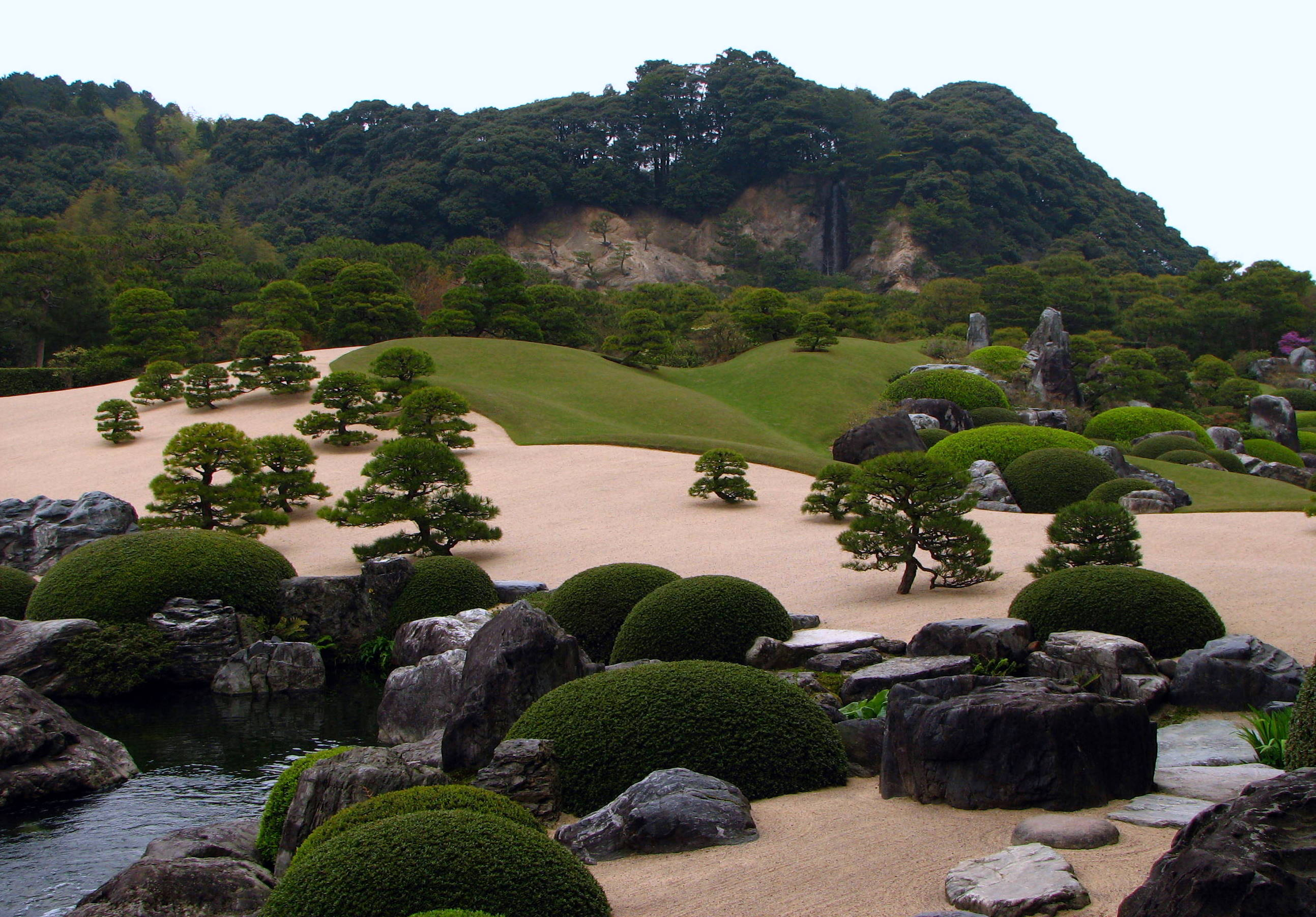
Garden of the Adachi Museum of Art

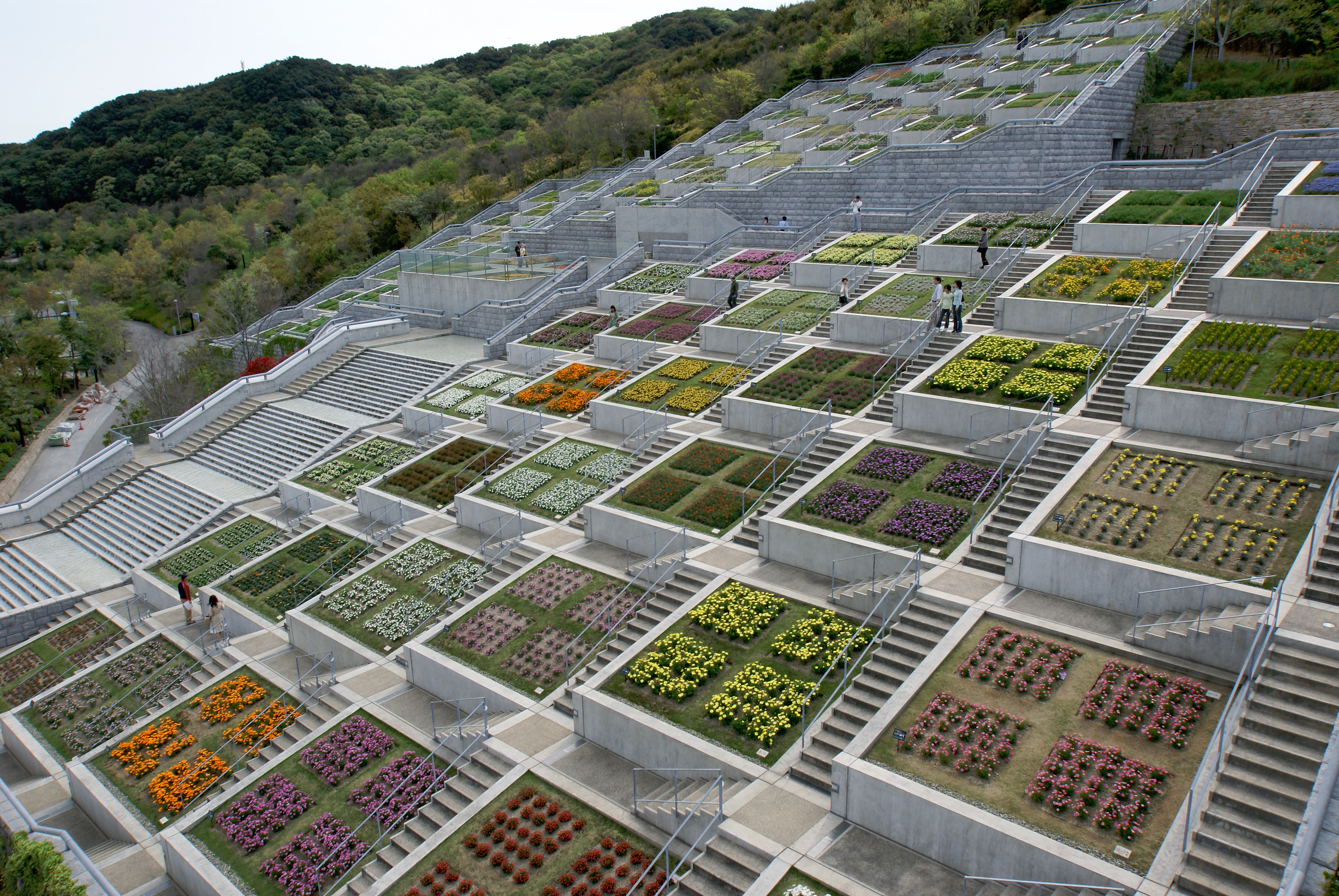
Awaji Yumebutai, a contemporary garden on the island of Awaji, Hyōgo (2000)

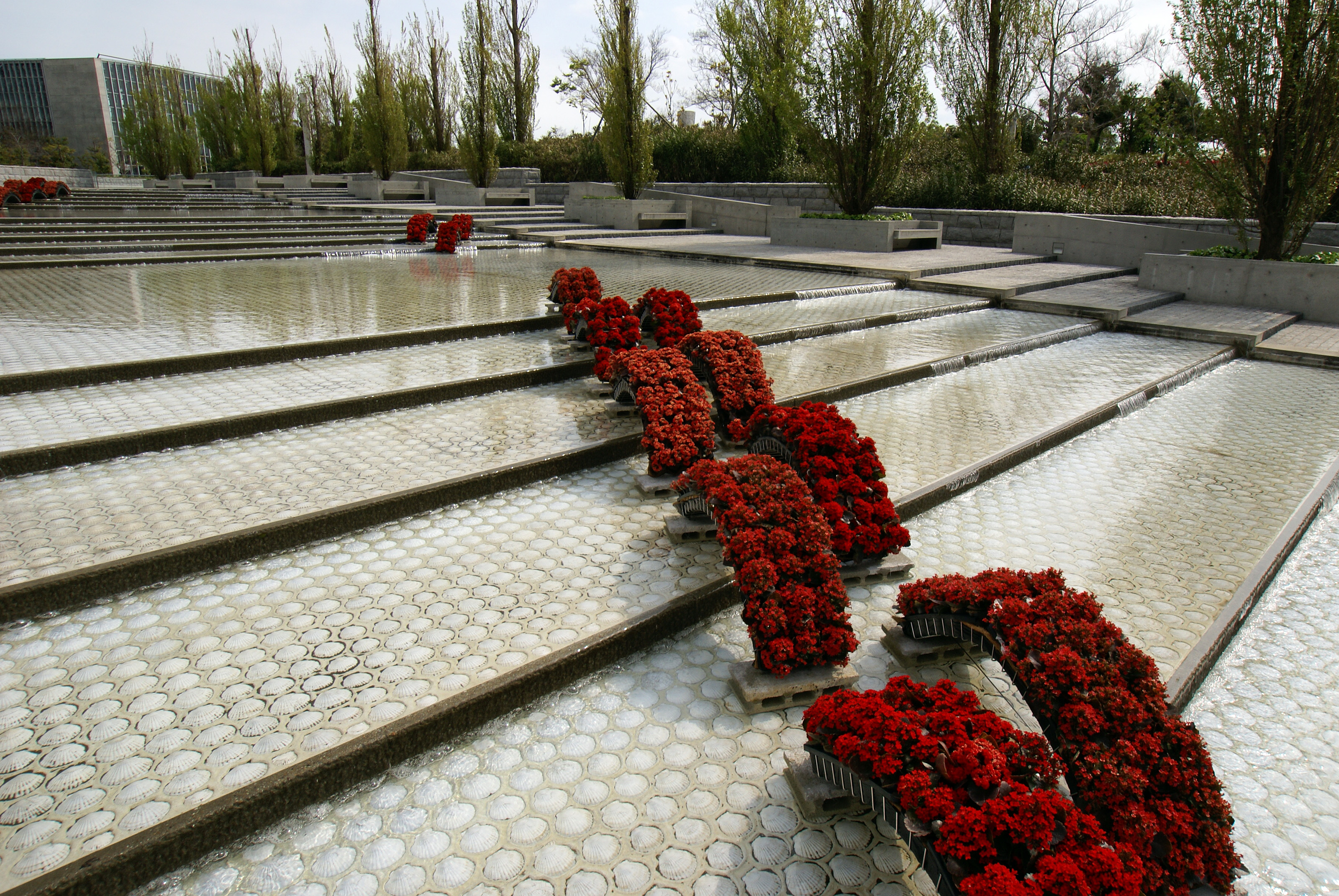
Shell beach garden, part of the Awaji Yumebutai on the island of Awaji, Hyōgo (2000)

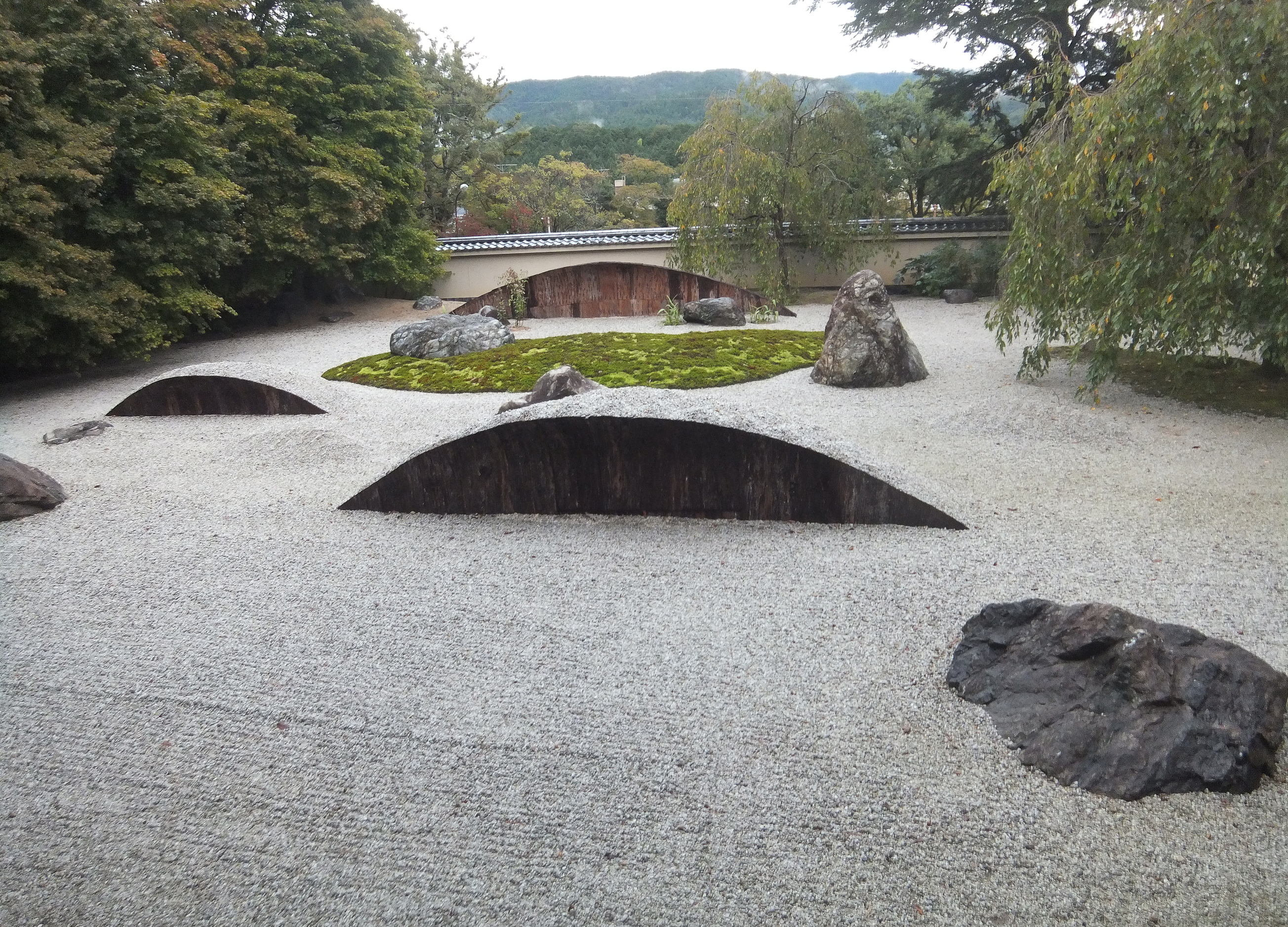
Jissō-in rock garden in Iwakura (Kyoto), reformed in 2013

== Garden elements ==
Japanese gardens are distinctive in their symbolism of nature, with traditional Japanese gardens being very different in style from occidental gardens: "Western gardens are typically optimised for visual appeal while Japanese gardens are modelled with spiritual and philosophical ideas in mind." Japanese gardens are conceived as a representation of a natural setting, tying in to Japanese connections between the land and Shinto spiritualism, where spirits are commonly found in nature; as such, Japanese gardens tend to incorporate natural materials, with the aim of creating a space that captures the beauties of nature in a realistic manner.

Traditional Japanese gardens can be categorized into three types: tsukiyama (hill gardens), karesansui (dry gardens) and chaniwa gardens (tea gardens).

The small space given to create these gardens usually poses a challenge for the gardeners. Due to the absolute importance of the arrangement of natural rocks and trees, finding the right material becomes highly selective. The serenity of a Japanese landscape and the simple but deliberate structures of the Japanese gardens are a unique quality, with the two most important principles of garden design being "scaled reduction and symbolization".

=== Water ===
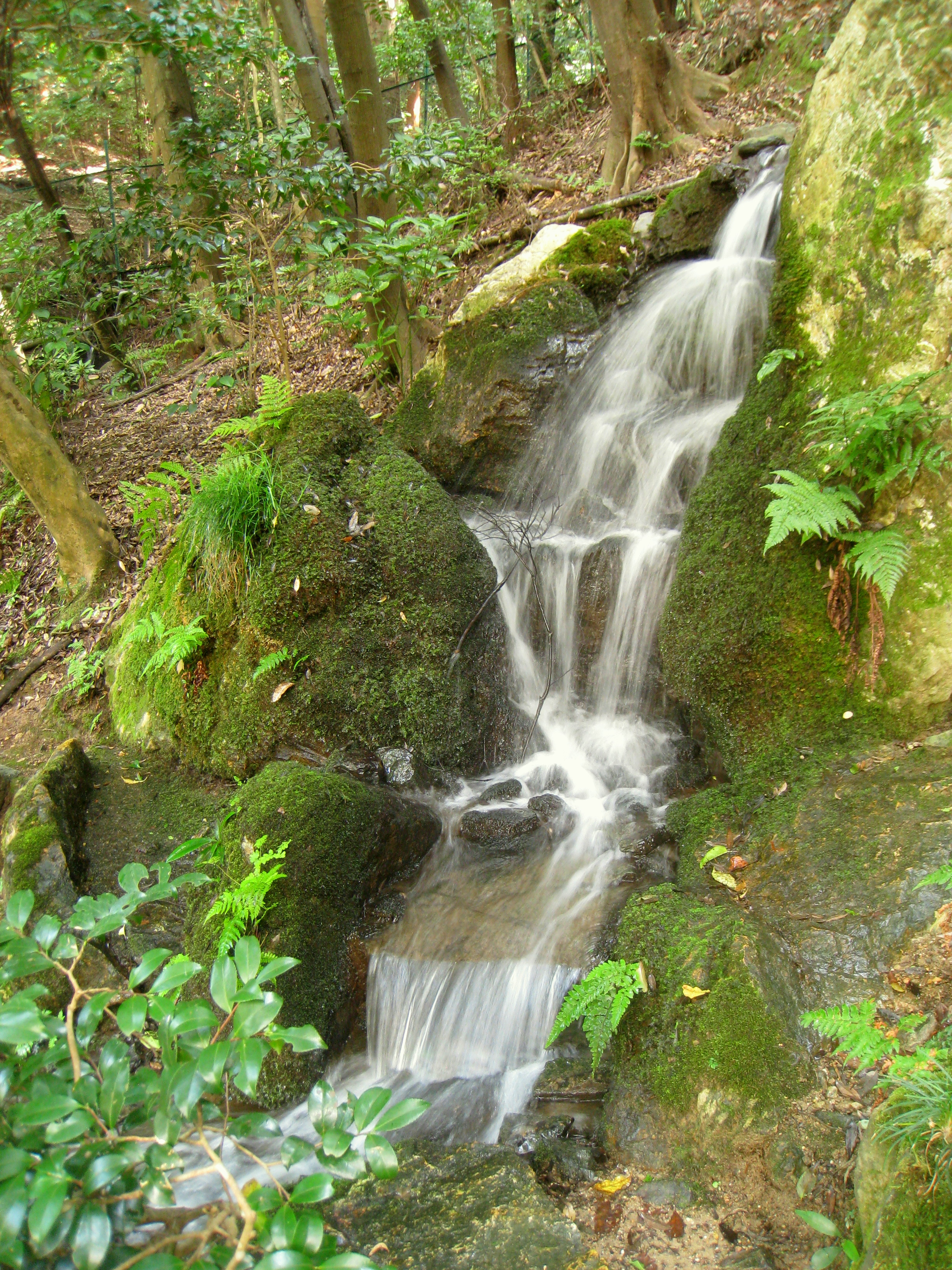
Cascade at Nanzen-ji garden in Kyoto

Japanese gardens always feature water, either physically with a pond or stream, or symbolically, represented by white sand in a dry rock garden. In Buddhist symbolism, water and stone are thought of as yin and yang, two opposites that complement and complete each other. A traditional garden will usually have an irregular-shaped pond or, in larger gardens, two or more ponds connected by a channel or stream, and a cascade, a miniature version of Japan's famous mountain waterfalls.

In traditional gardens, the ponds and streams are carefully placed according to Buddhist geomancy, the art of putting things in the place most likely to attract good fortune. The rules for the placement of water were laid out in the first manual of Japanese gardens, the Sakuteiki ("Records of Garden Making"), in the 11th century. According to the Sakuteiki, water should enter the garden from the east or southeast and flow toward the west, because the east is the home of the Green Dragon (seiryu), an ancient Chinese divinity adopted in Japan, and the west is the home of the White Tiger, the divinity of the east. Water flowing from east to west will carry away evil, and the owner of the garden will be healthy and have a long life. According to the Sakuteiki, another favorable arrangement is for the water to flow from north, which represents water in Buddhist cosmology, to the south, which represents fire, which are opposites (yin and yang) and therefore will bring good luck.

The Sakuteiki recommends several possible miniature landscapes using lakes and streams: the "ocean style", which features rocks that appear to have been eroded by waves, a sandy beach, and pine trees; the "broad river style", recreating the course of a large river, winding like a serpent; the "marsh pond" style, a large still pond with aquatic plants; the "mountain torrent style", with many rocks and cascades; and the "rose letters" style, an austere landscape with small, low plants, gentle relief and many scattered flat rocks.

Traditional Japanese gardens have small islands in the lakes. In sacred temple gardens, there is usually an island which represents Mount Penglai or Mount Hōrai, the traditional home of the Eight Immortals.

The Sakuteiki describes different kinds of artificial island which can be created in lakes, including the "mountainous island", made up of jagged vertical rocks mixed with pine trees, surrounded by a sandy beach; the "rocky island", composed of "tormented" rocks appearing to have been battered by sea waves, along with small, ancient pine trees with unusual shapes; the "cloud island", made of white sand in the rounded white forms of a cumulus cloud; and the "misty island", a low island of sand, without rocks or trees.

A cascade or waterfall is an important element in Japanese gardens, a miniature version of the waterfalls of Japanese mountain streams. The Sakuteiki describes seven kinds of cascades. It notes that if possible, a cascade should face toward the moon and should be designed to capture the moon's reflection in the water. It is also mentioned in Sakuteiki that cascades benefit from being located in such a manner that they are half-hidden in shadows.

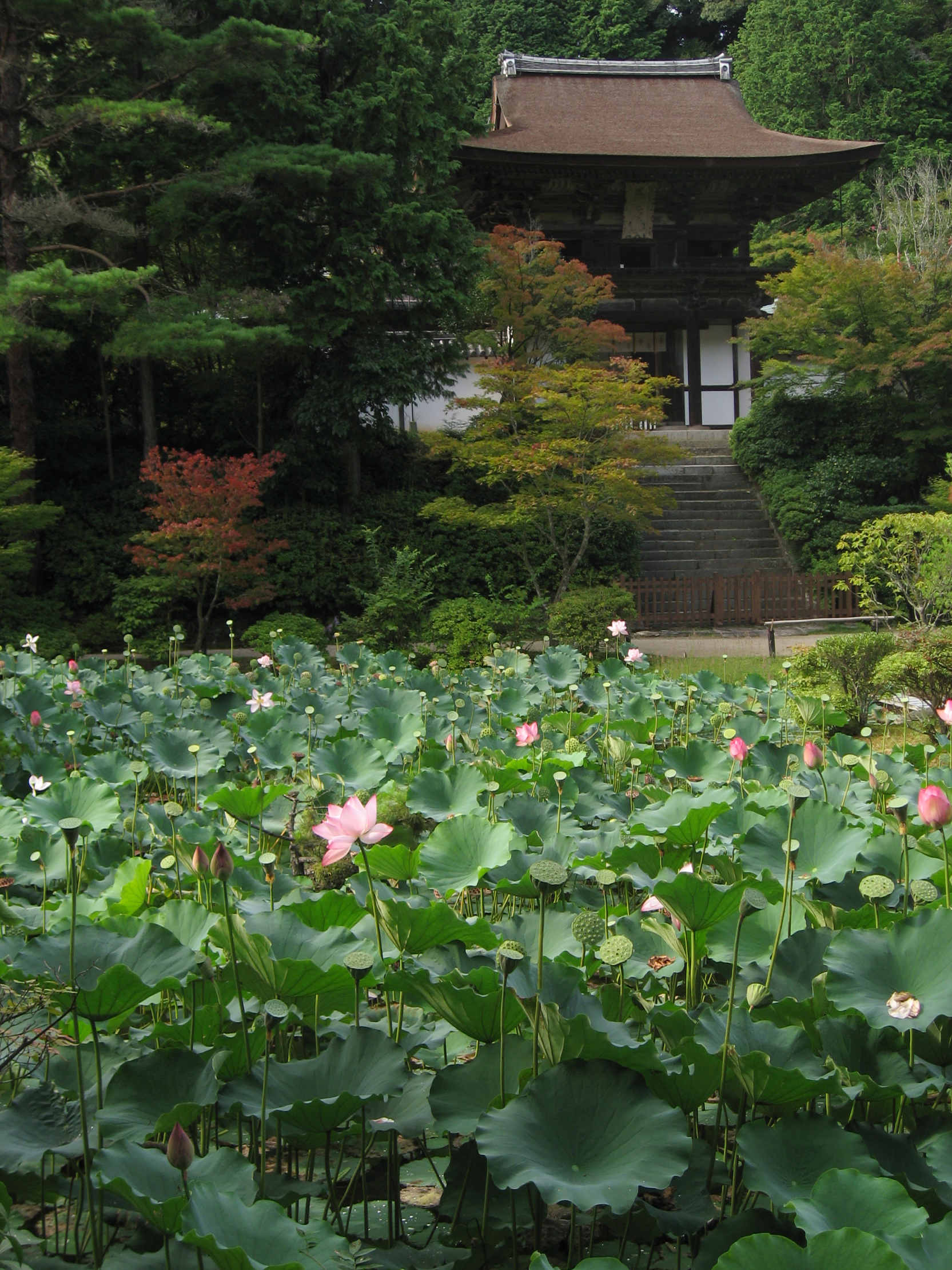
Lotus pond at Enjo-ji, a Heian period paradise garden (12th century)

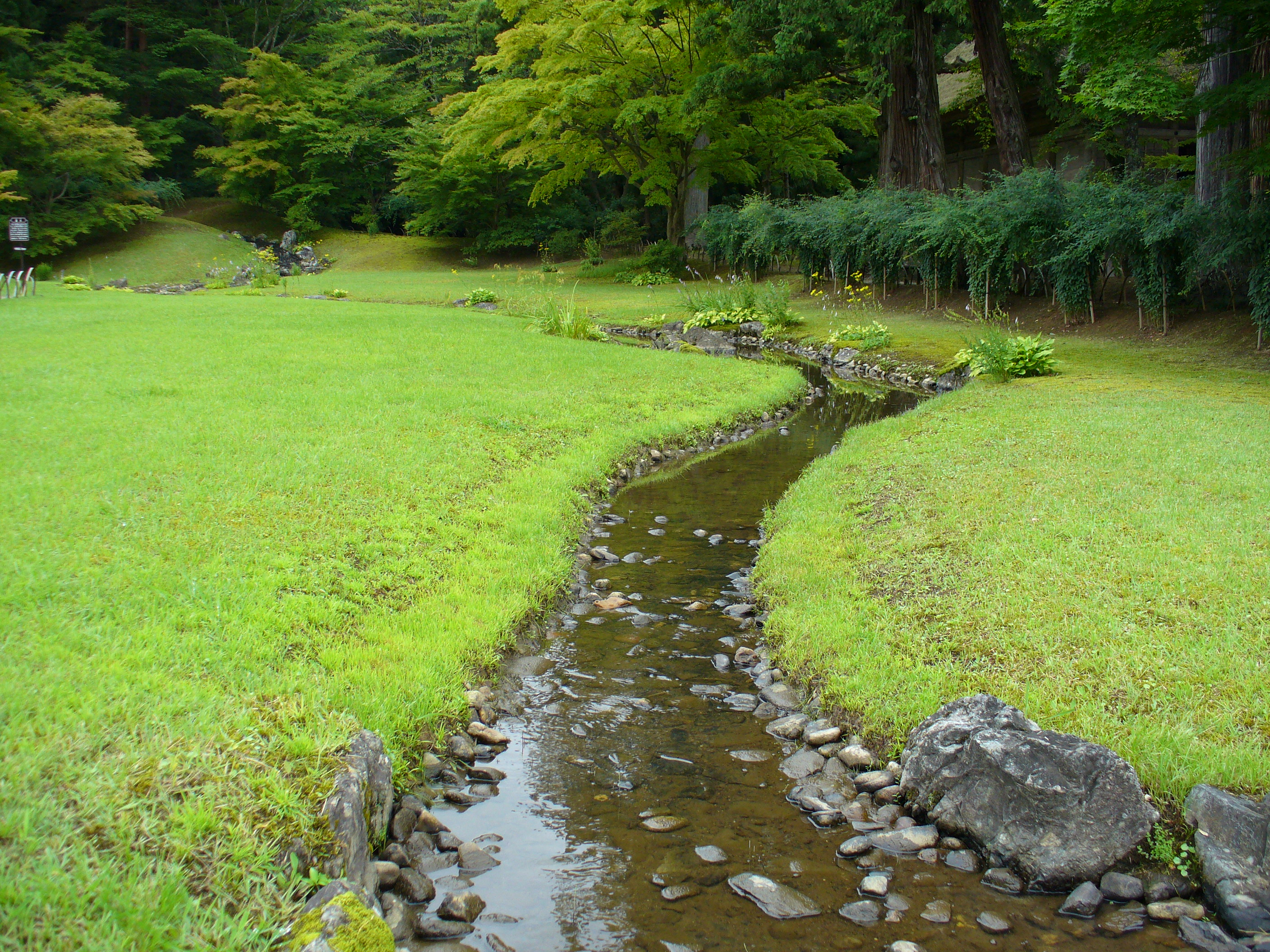
A winding stream at Mōtsū-ji garden in Hiraisumi

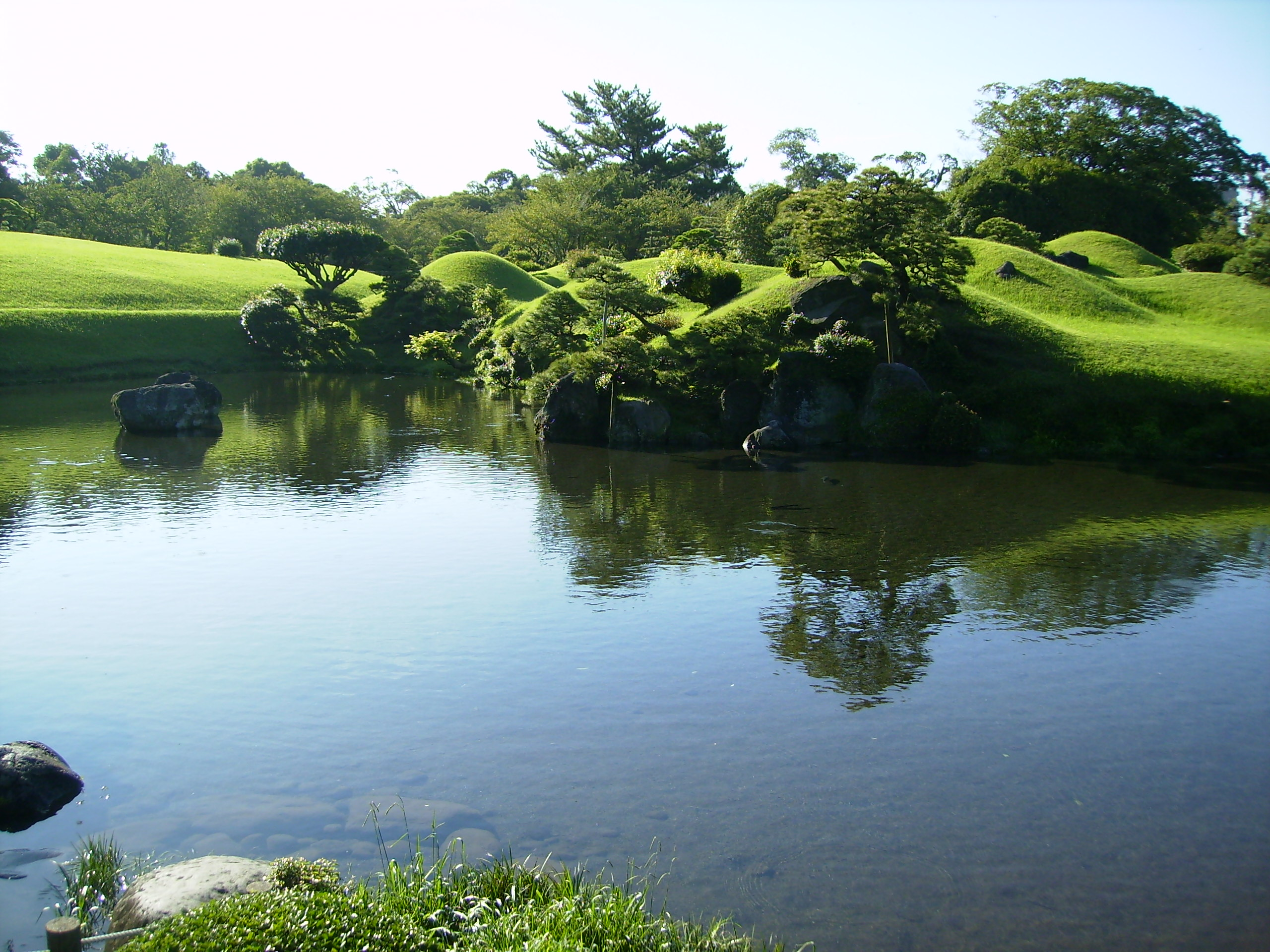
The spring-fed pond at Suizen-ji Jōju-en garden (1636), whose water was reputed to be excellent for making tea

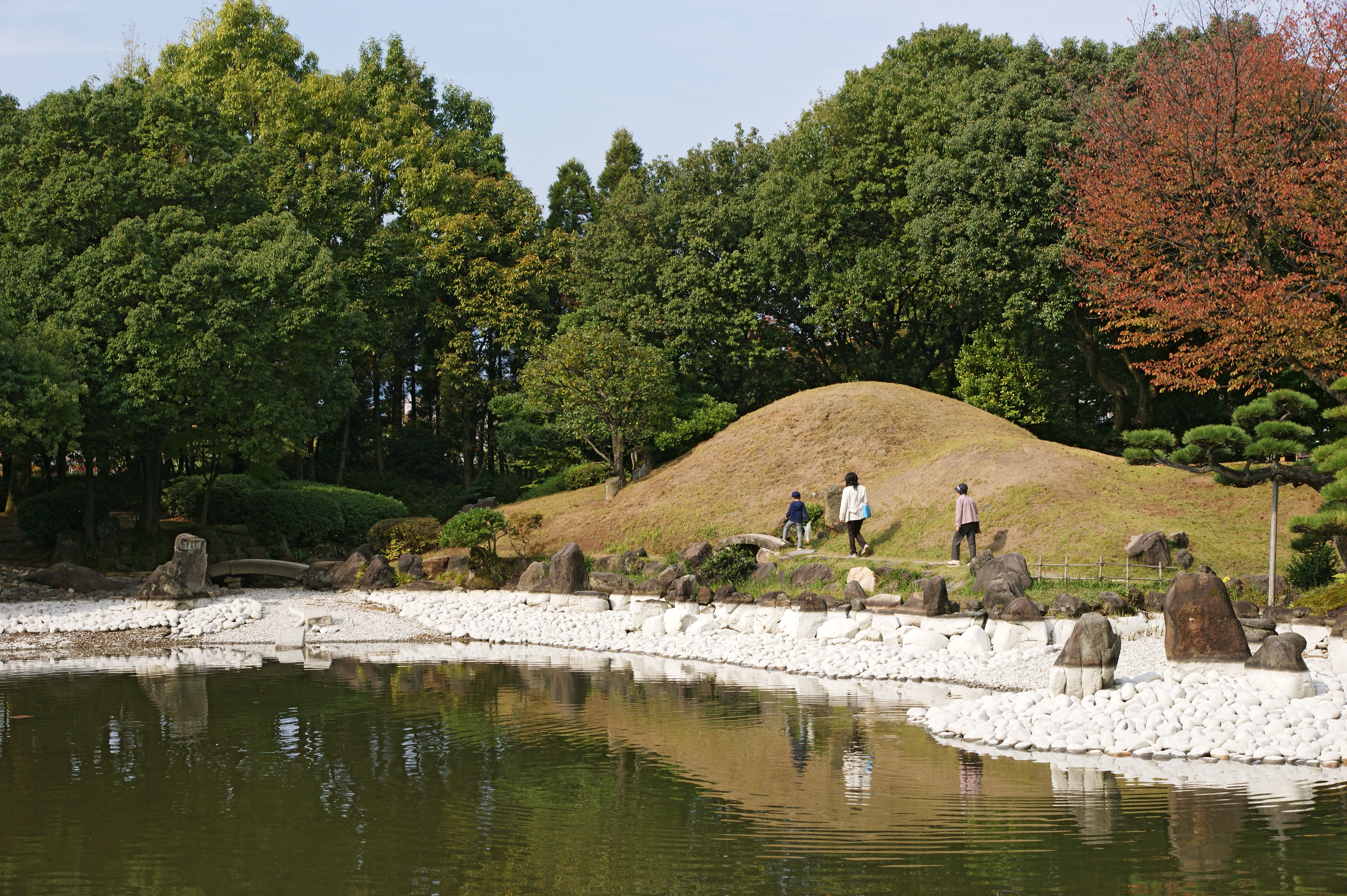
Youkoukan Garden in Fukui Prefecture recreates a miniature beach and a mountain.

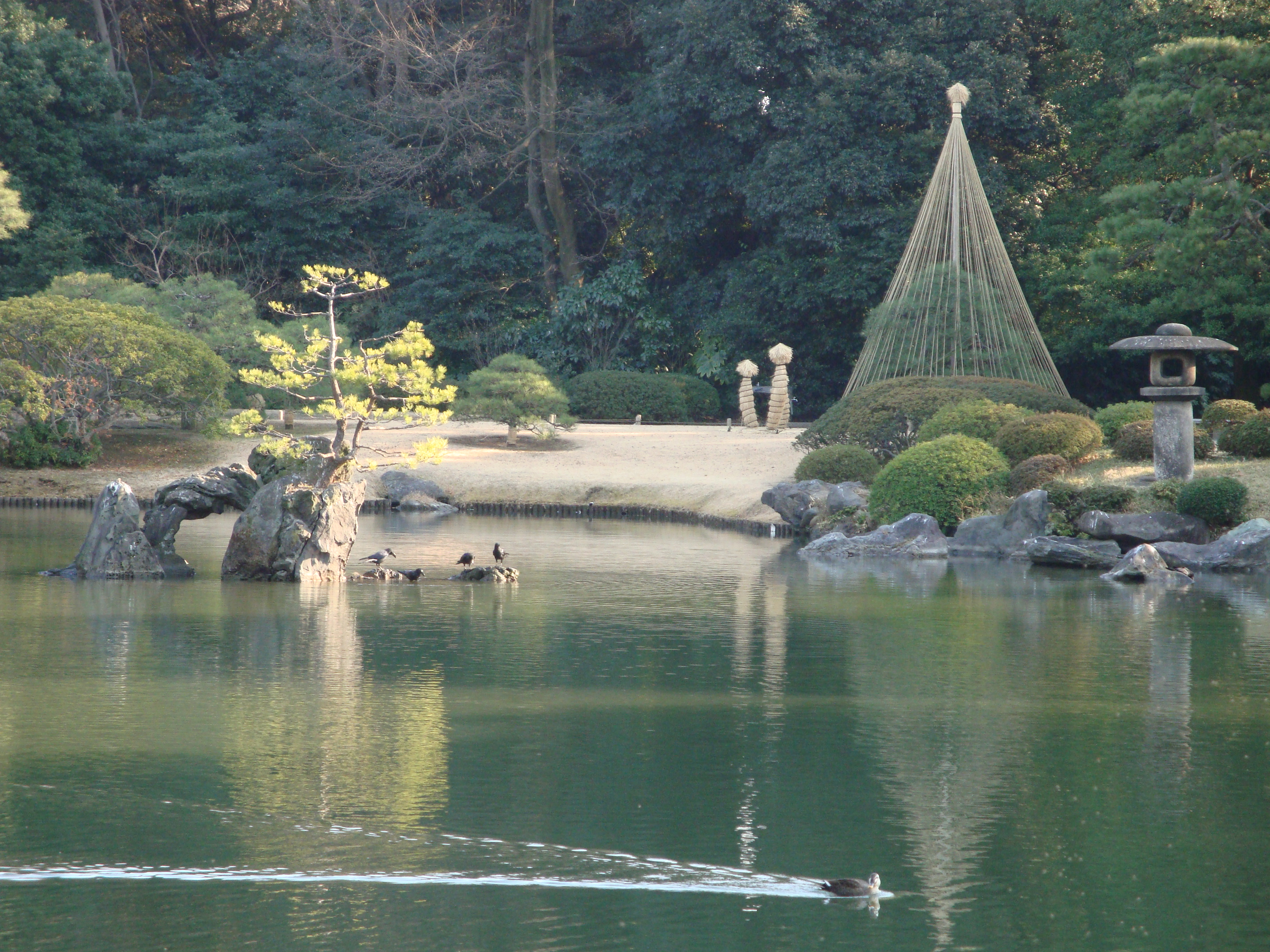
An island of weathered rocks and a single pine tree in Rikugi-en garden in Tokyo represents Mount Hōrai, the legendary home of the Eight Immortals.

=== Rocks and sand ===
Rock, sand and gravel are an essential feature of the Japanese garden. A vertical rock may represent Mount Horai, the legendary home of the Eight Immortals, or Mount Sumeru of Buddhist teaching, or a carp jumping from the water. A flat rock might represent the earth. Sand or gravel can represent a beach, or a flowing river. Rocks and water also symbolize yin and yang (in and yō in Japanese) in Buddhist philosophy; the hard rock and soft water complement each other, and water, though soft, can wear away rock.

Rough volcanic rocks (kasei-gan) are usually used to represent mountains or as stepping stones. Smooth and round sedimentary rocks (suisei-gan) are used around lakes or as stepping stones. Hard metamorphic rocks are usually placed by waterfalls or streams. Rocks are traditionally classified as tall vertical, low vertical, arching, reclining, or flat. Rocks should vary in size and color but from each other, but not have bright colors, which would lack subtlety. Rocks with strata or veins should have the veins all going in the same direction, and the rocks should all be firmly planted in the earth, giving an appearance of firmness and permanence. Rocks are arranged in careful compositions of two, three, five or seven rocks, with three being the most common. In a three-arrangement, a tallest rock usually represents heaven, the shortest rock is the earth, and the medium-sized rock is humanity, the bridge between heaven and earth. Sometimes one or more rocks, called suteishi ("nameless" or "discarded"), are placed in seemingly random locations in the garden, to suggest spontaneity, though their placement is carefully chosen.

In ancient Japan, sand (suna) and gravel (jari) were used around Shinto shrines and Buddhist temples. Later it was used in the Japanese rock garden or Zen Buddhist gardens to represent water or clouds. White sand represented purity, but sand could also be gray, brown or bluish-black.

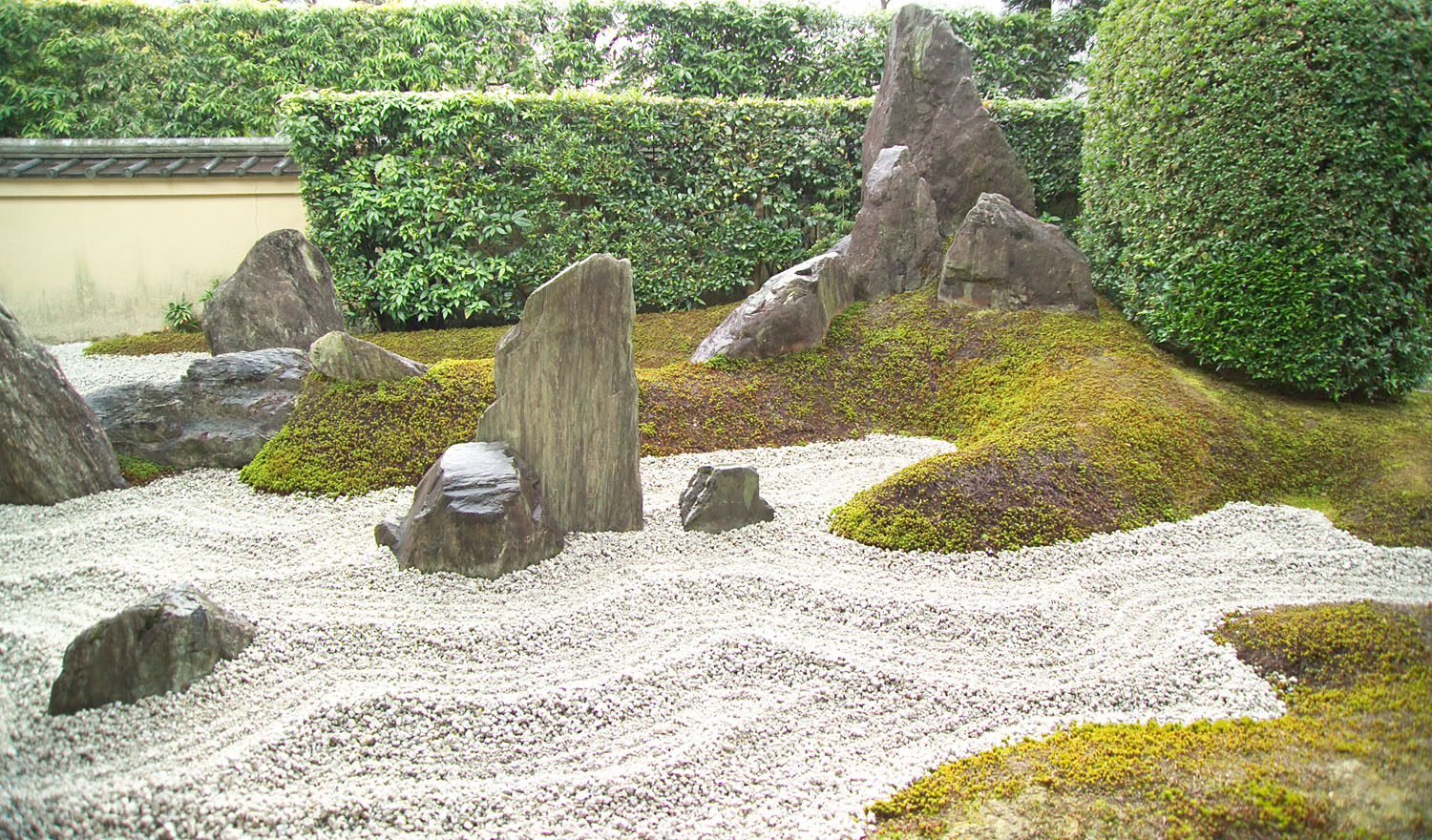
Rocks in the Garden of the Blissful Mountain at Daitoku-ji

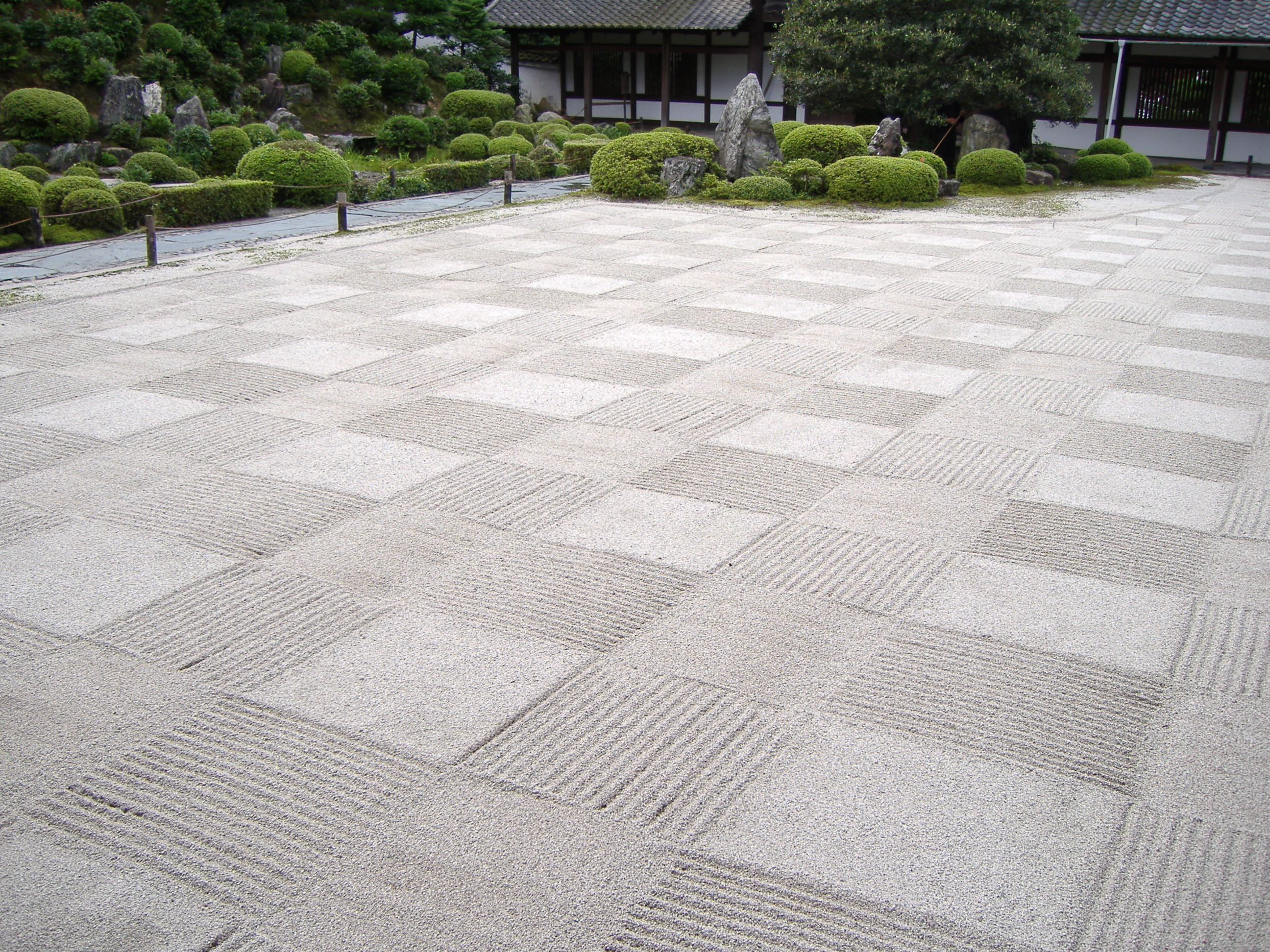
Sand in checkerboard pattern at Tōfuku-ji, in Kyoto

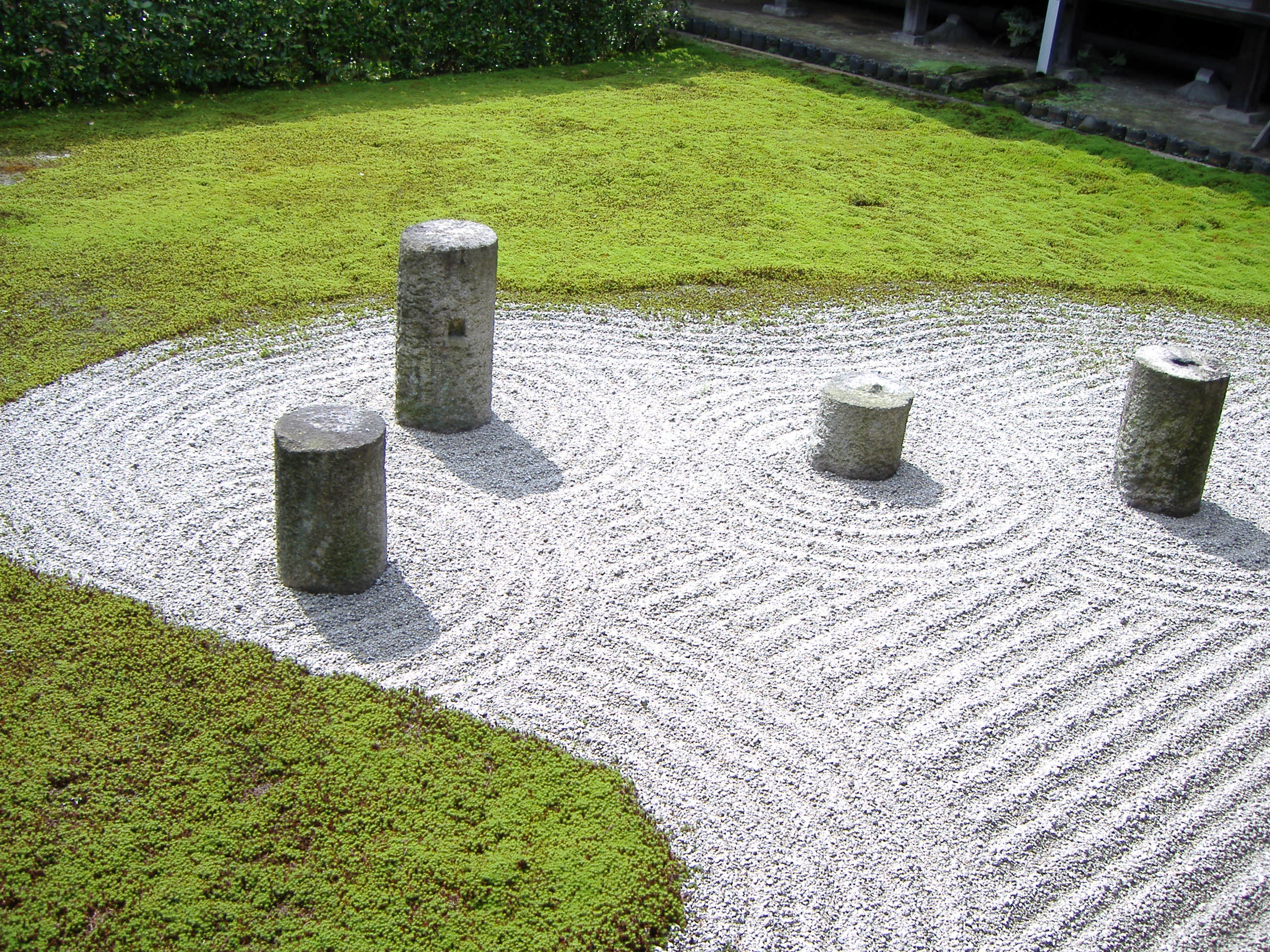
Tōfuku-ji garden in Kyoto

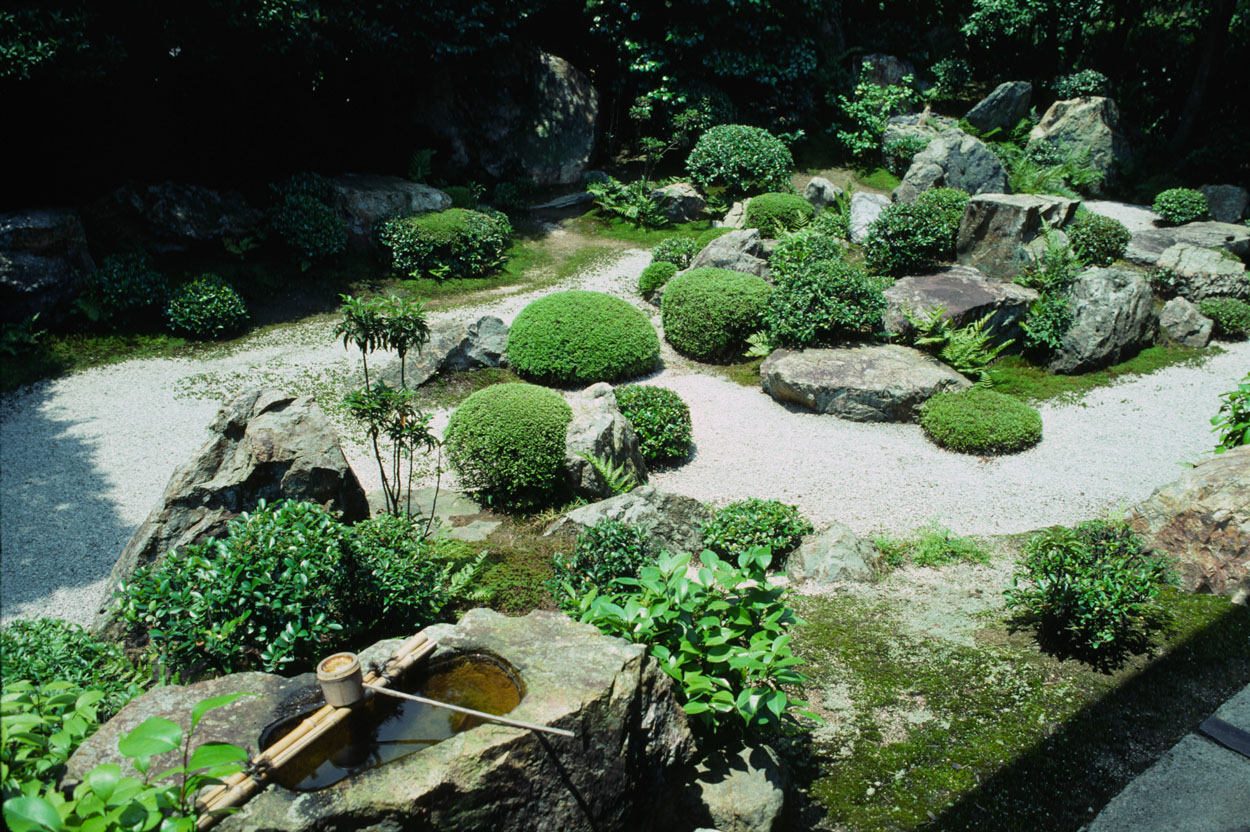
Myōshin-ji garden

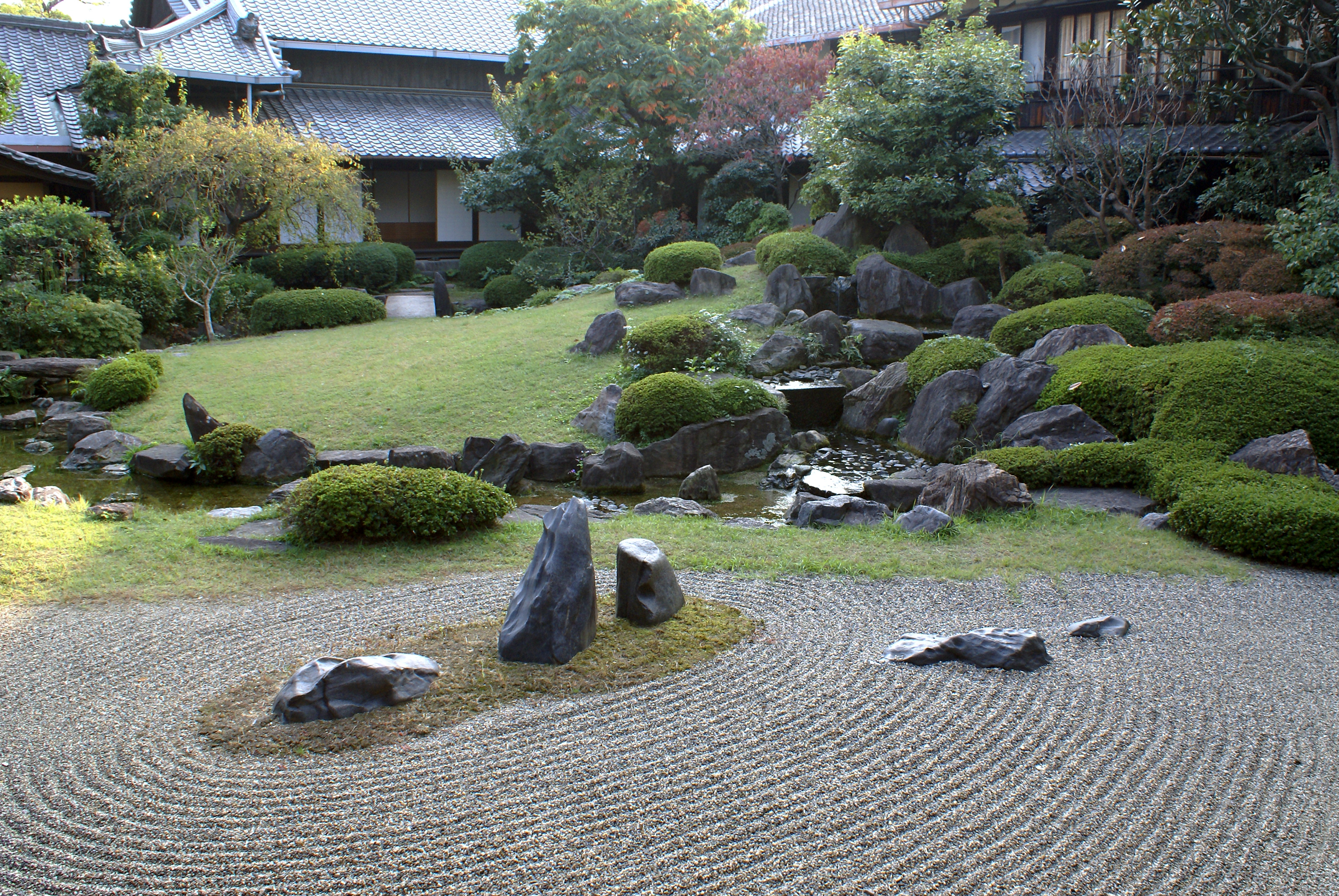
Shitenno-ji garden. Note the three-rock composition in the center.

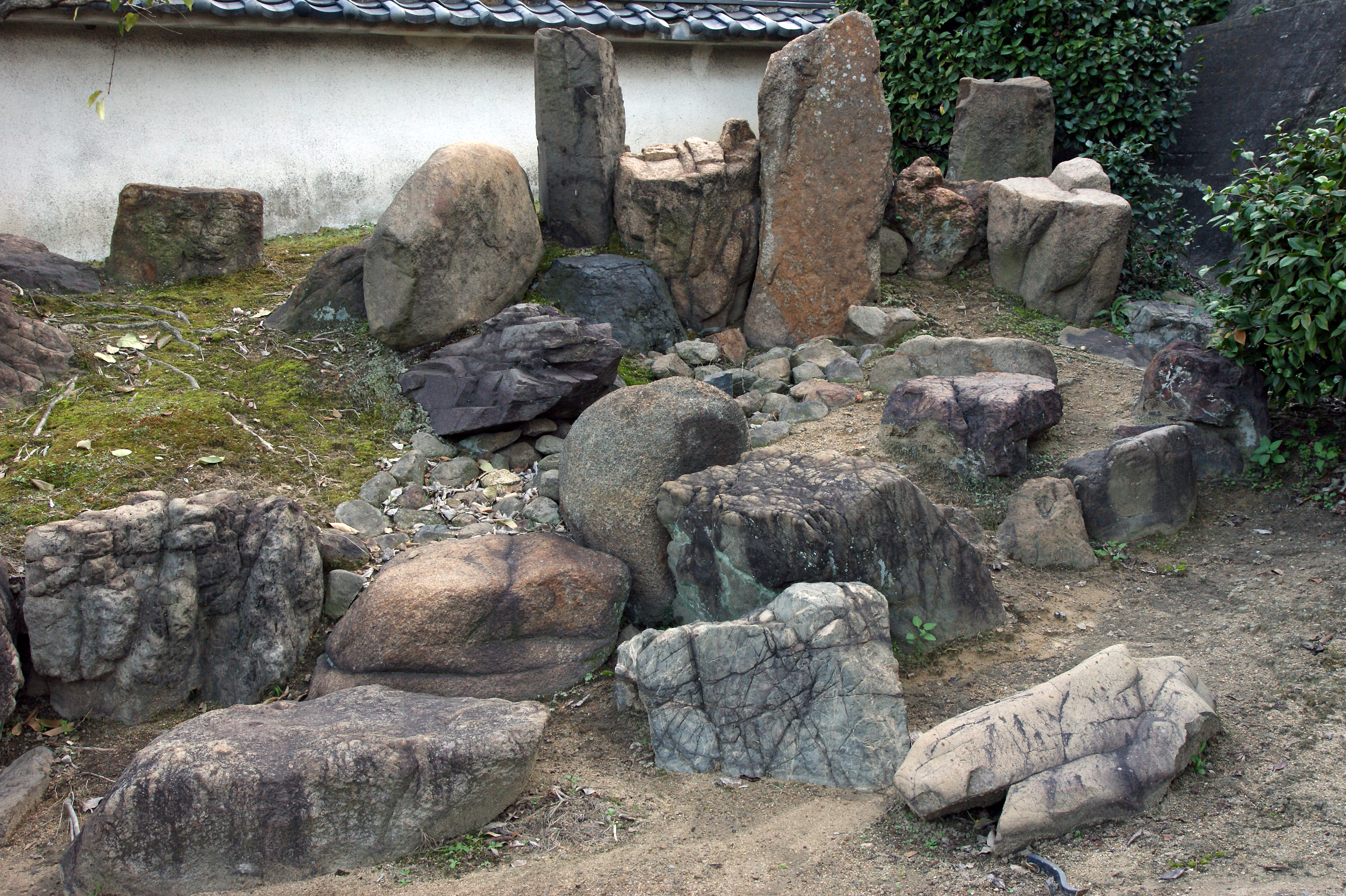
Ankokuji garden in Hiroshima features rocks of different but harmonious sizes and colors.

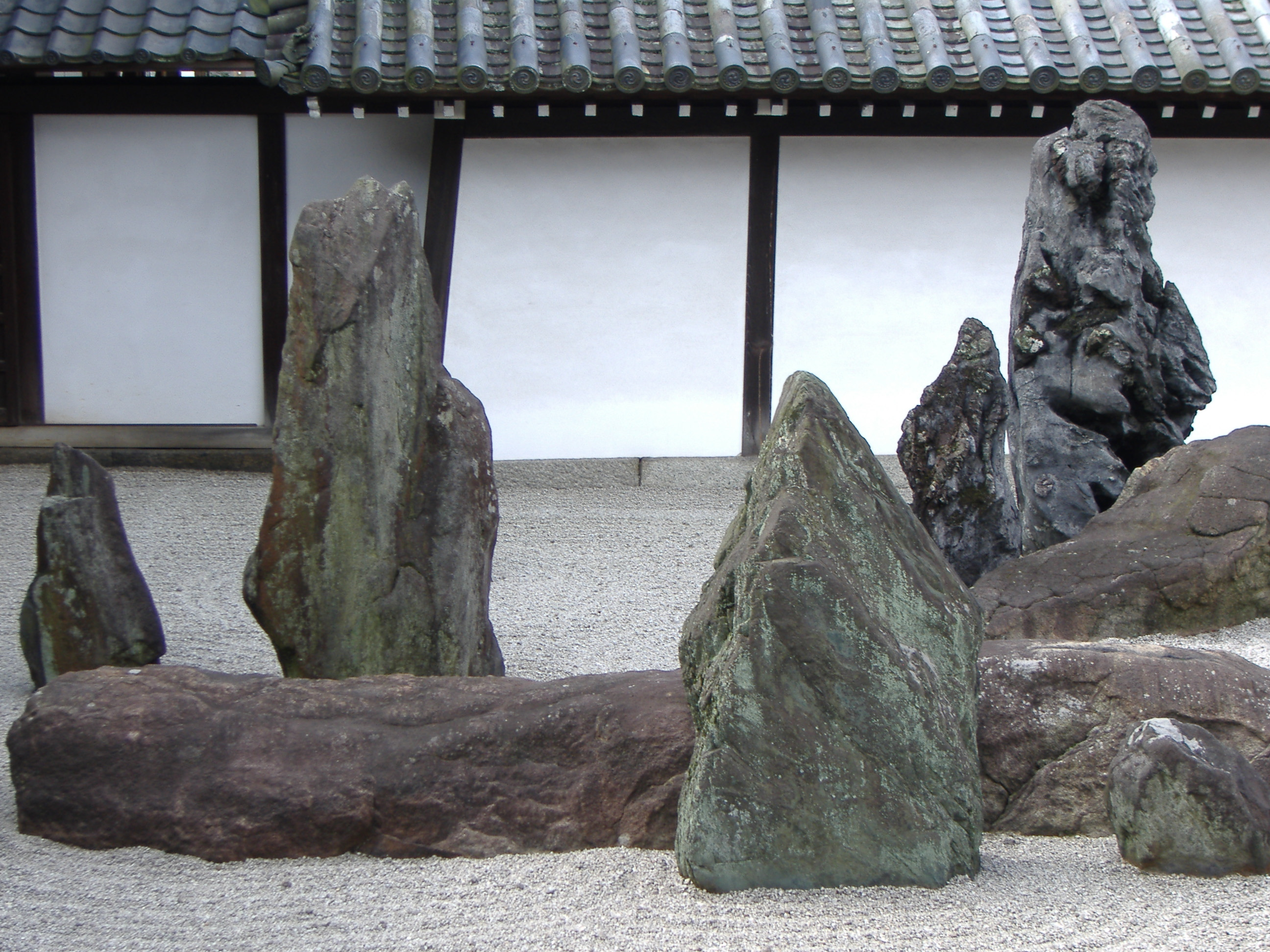
Rock composition at Tōfuku-ji (1934)

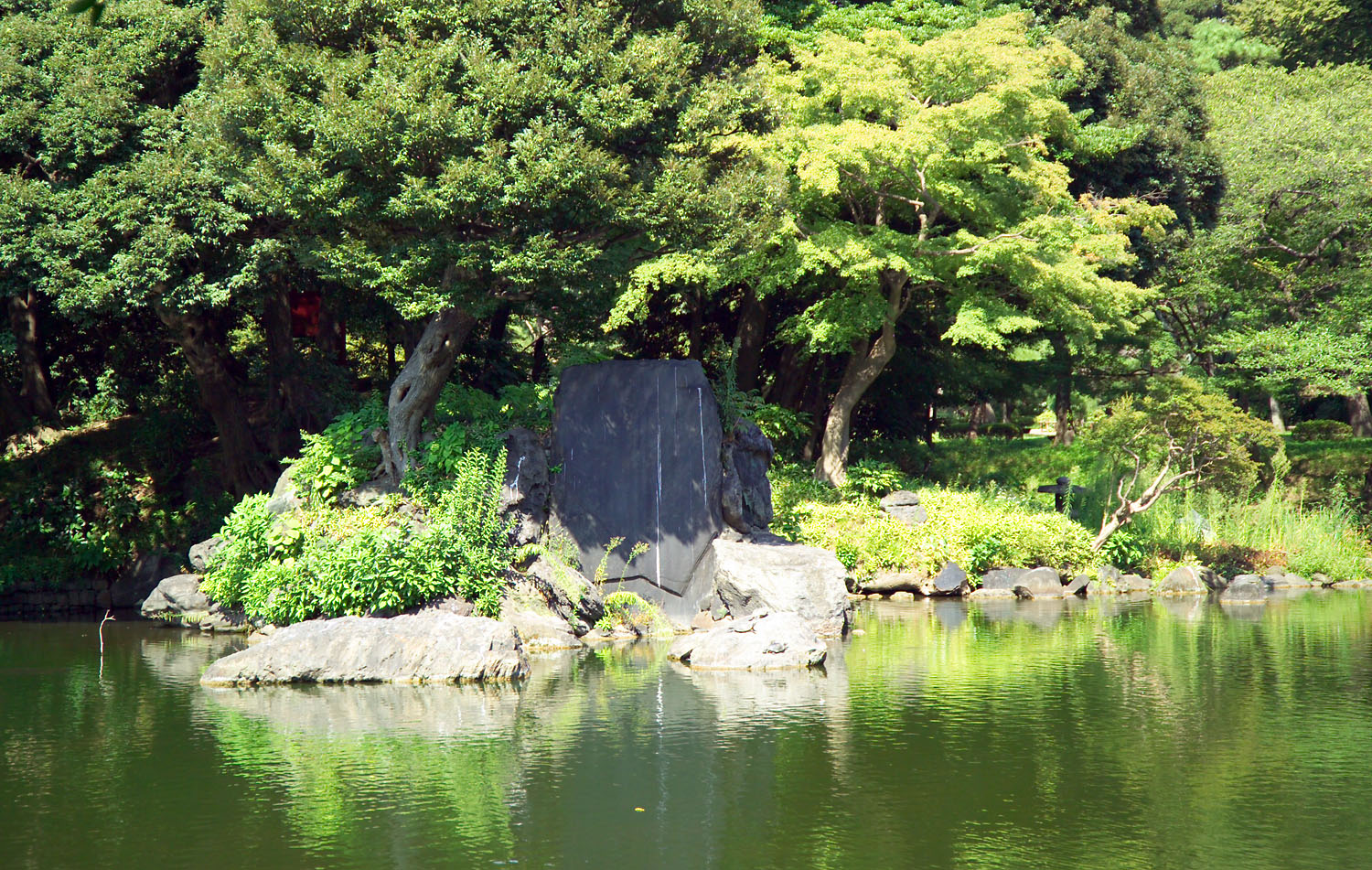
A large flat rock on an island in Korakuen garden in Tokyo, which represents a turtle's head

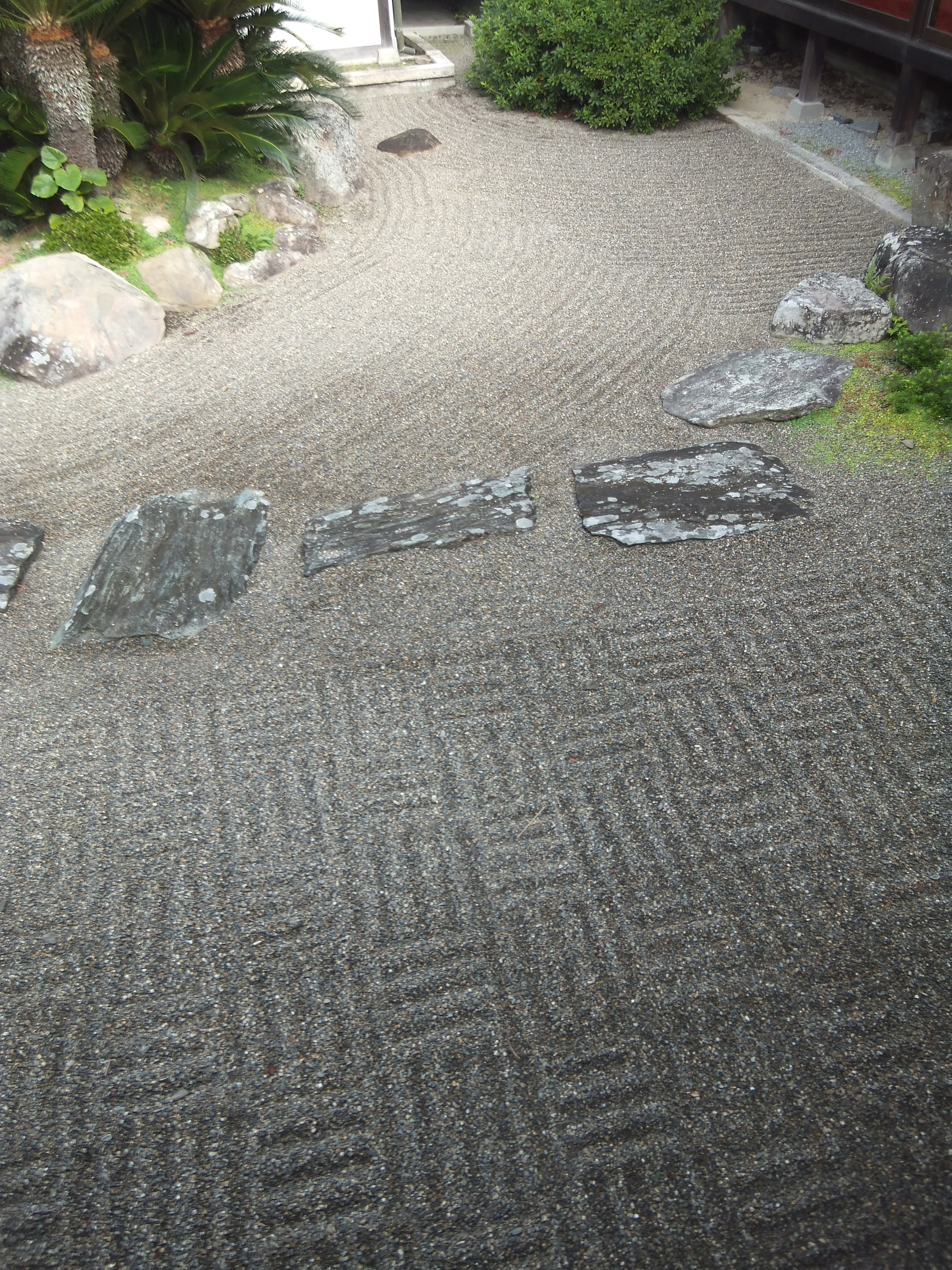
Combination of checkerboard pattern and water patterns at the Negoro-ji Temple, Prefecture Wakayama

Selection and subsequent placement of rocks was and still is a central concept in creating an aesthetically pleasing garden by the Japanese. During the Heian period, the concept of placing stones as symbolic representations of islands – whether physically existent or nonexistent – began to take hold, and can be seen in the Japanese word shima, which is of "particular importance [...] because the word contained the meaning 'island'". Furthermore, the principle of kowan ni shitagau, or "obeying (or following) the request of an object", was, and still is, a guiding principle of Japanese rock design that suggests "the arrangement of rocks be dictated by their innate characteristics". The specific placement of stones in Japanese gardens to symbolically represent islands (and later to include mountains), is found to be an aesthetically pleasing property of traditional Japanese gardens.

Thomas Heyd outlines some of the aesthetic principles of Japanese gardens in Encountering Nature:

Stones, which constitute a fundamental part of Japanese gardens, are carefully selected for their weathering and are placed in such a way that they give viewers the sense that they 'naturally' belong where they are, and in combinations in which the viewers [sic] find them. As such, this form of gardening attempts to emblematically represent (or present) the processes and spaces found in wild nature, away from city and practical concerns of human life.

— Thomas Heyd, Encountering Nature

Rock placement is a general "aim to portray nature in its essential characteristics" – the essential goal of all Japanese gardens. Furthermore, Heyd states:

[...]while the cult of stones is also central to Japanese gardening [...] as stones were part of an aesthetic design and had to be placed so that their positions appeared natural and their relationships harmonious. The concentration of the interest on such detail as the shape of a rock or the moss on a stone lantern led at times to an overemphatic picturesqueness and accumulation of minor features that, to Western eyes accustomed to a more general survey, may seem cluttered and restless.

— Thomas Heyd, Encyclopædia Britannica, Garden and Landscape Design: Japanese

Such attention to detail can be seen at places such as Midori Falls in Kenroku-en Garden in Kanazawa, Ishikawa Prefecture, as the rocks at the waterfall's base were changed at various times by six different daimyō.

In Heian-period Japanese gardens, built in the Chinese model, buildings occupied as much or more space than the garden. The garden was designed to be seen from the main building and its verandas, or from small pavilions built for that purpose. In later gardens, the buildings were less visible. Rustic teahouses were hidden in their own little gardens, and small benches and open pavilions along the garden paths provided places for rest and contemplation. In later garden architecture, walls of houses and teahouses could be opened to provide carefully framed views of the garden. The garden and the house became one.

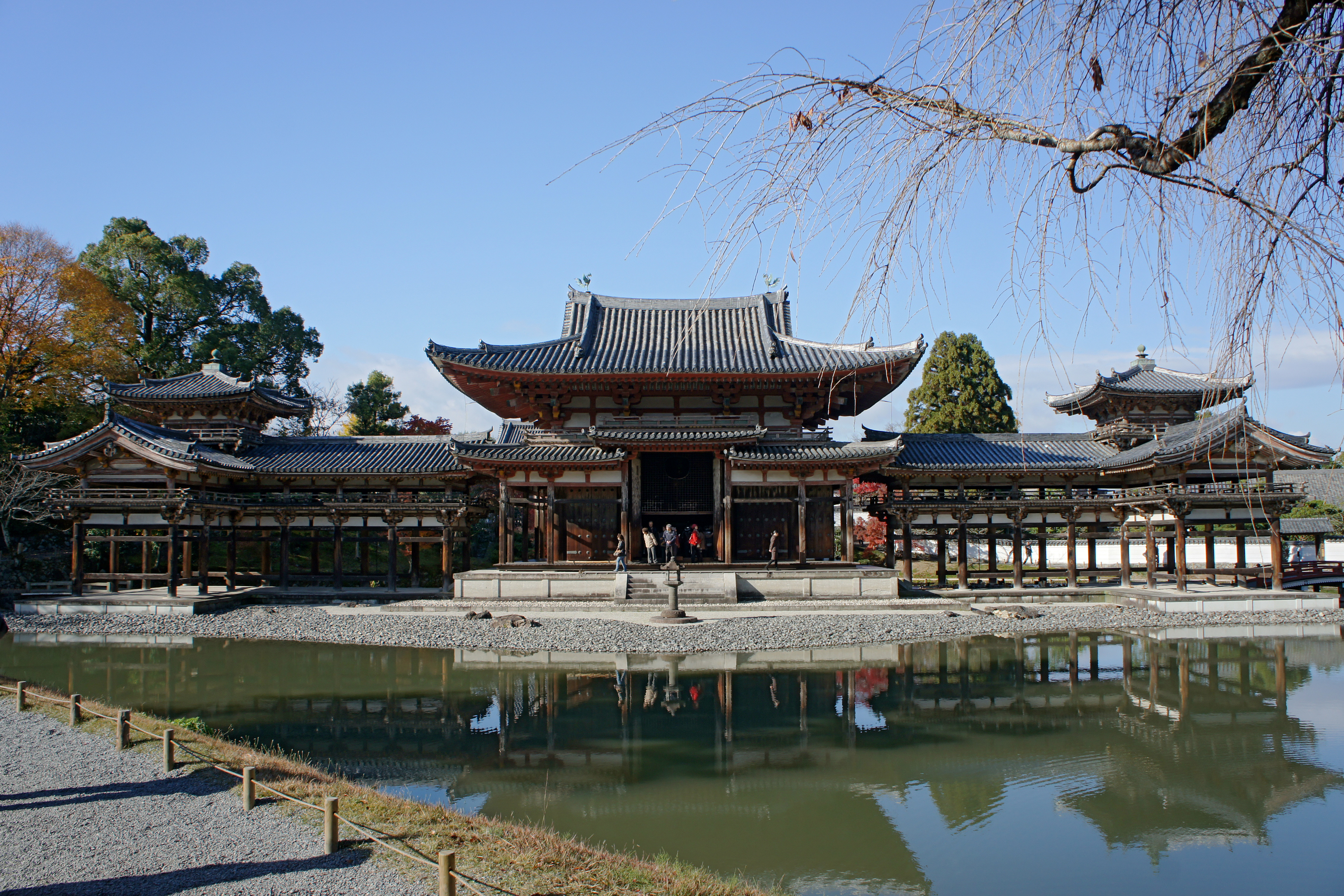
The symmetrical and highly ornamental architecture of the Phoenix Hall in Byōdō-in Garden, Kyoto (1052) was inspired by Chinese Song dynasty architecture.

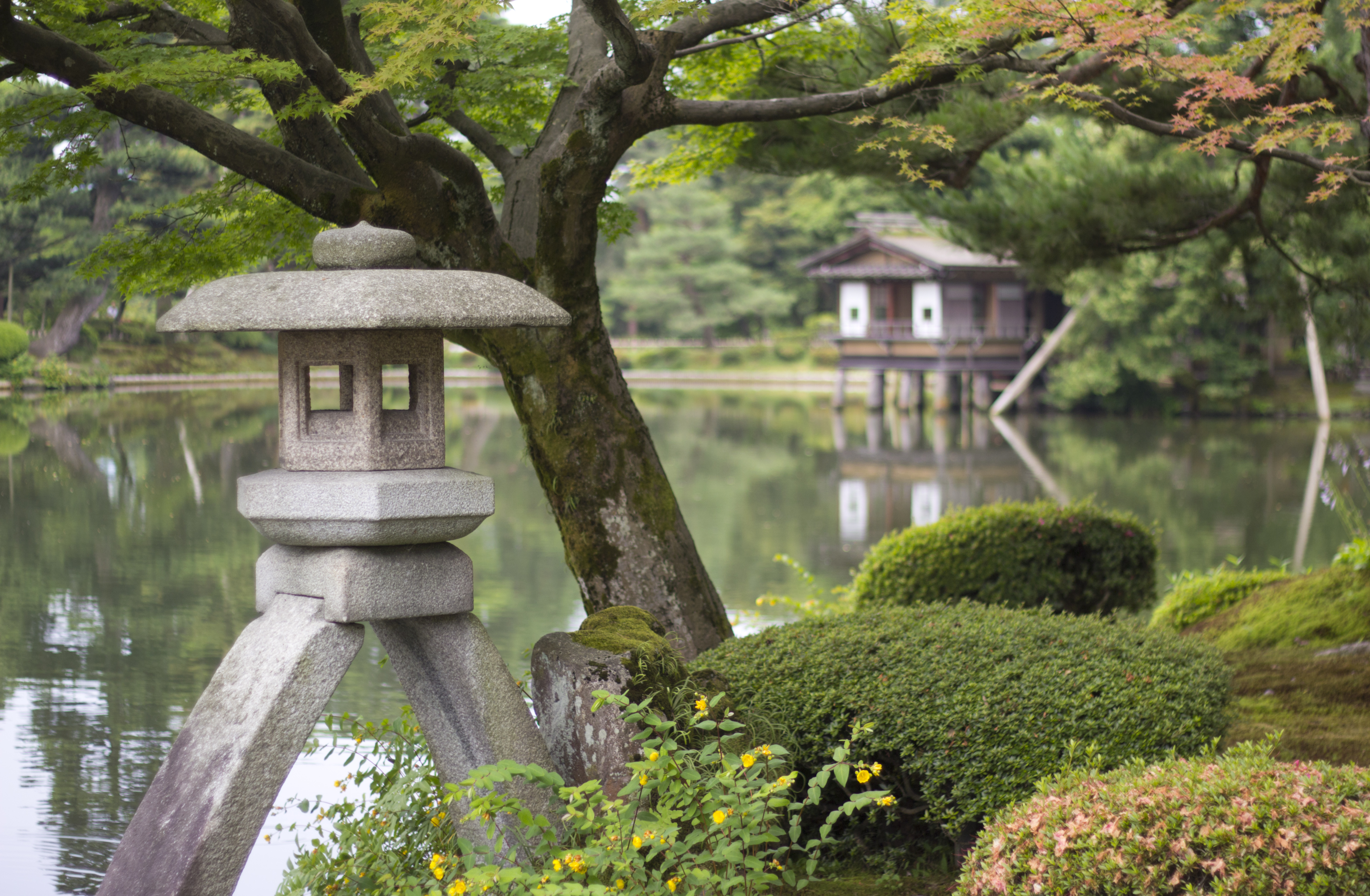
The Kotoji Tōrō, a two-legged stone lantern that is one of the most well-known symbols of the Kenroku-en garden

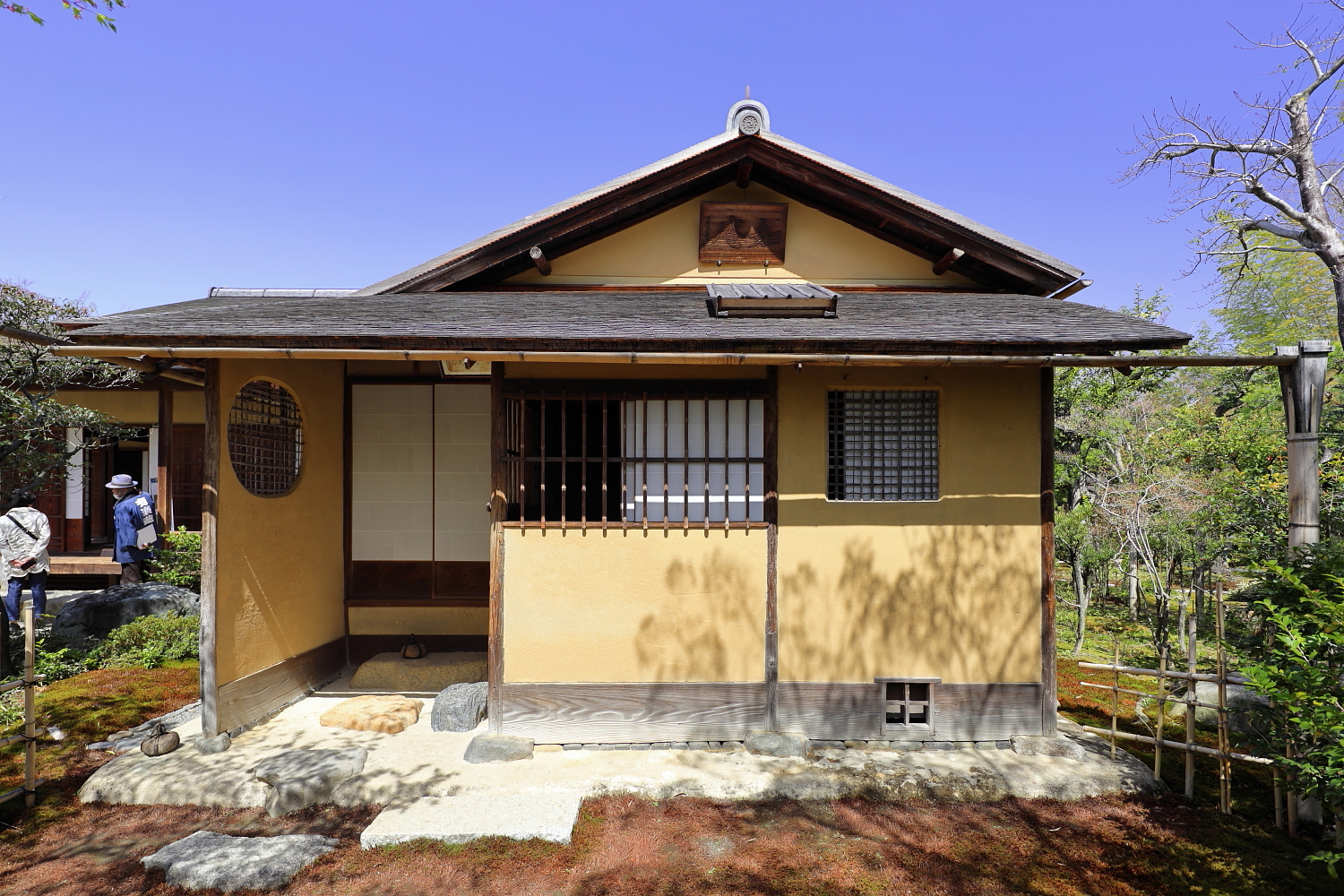
A chashitsu or teahouse in Jo-an garden in Inuyama, from 1618. The simple and unadorned zen teahouse style began to be used on all Japanese buildings, from garden pavilions to palaces. This teahouse was declared a National Treasure of Japan in 1951.

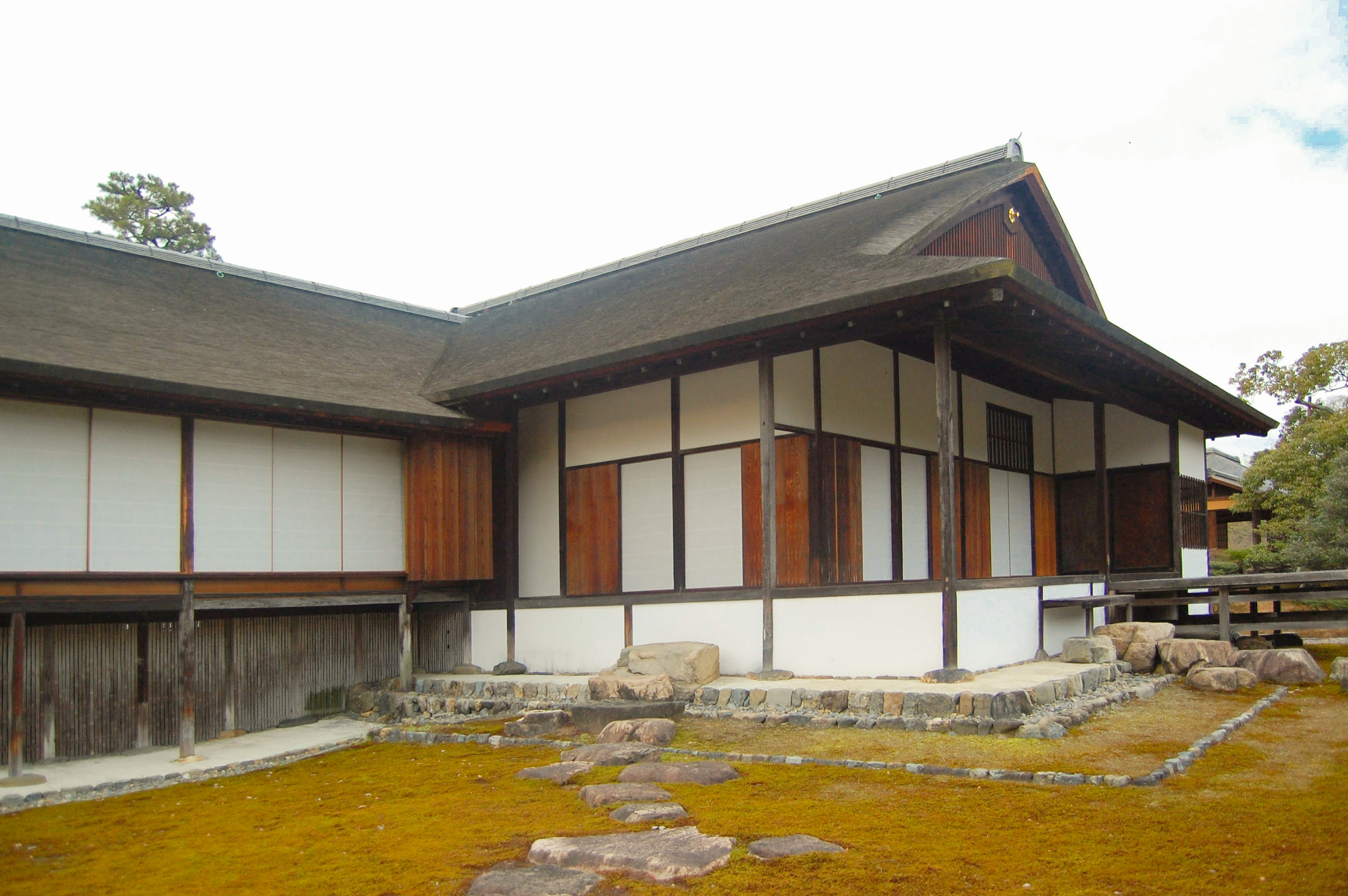
The architecture of the main house of the Katsura Imperial Villa (1619–1662) was inspired by the simplicity of the tea house.

=== Garden bridges ===
Bridges first appeared in the Japanese garden during the Heian period. At the Byōdō-in garden in Kyoto, a wooden bridge connects the Phoenix pavilion with a small island of stones, representing the Mount Penglai or Mount Horai, the island home of the Eight Immortals of Daoist teaching, The bridge symbolized the path to paradise and immortality.

Bridges could be made of stone (ishibashi), or of wood, or made of logs with earth on top, covered with moss (dobashi); they could be either arched (soribashi) or flat (hirabashi). Sometimes if they were part of a temple garden, they were painted red, following the Chinese tradition, but for the most part they were unpainted.

During the Edo period, when large promenade gardens became popular, streams and winding paths were constructed, with a series of bridges, usually in a rustic stone or wood style, to take visitors on a tour of the scenic views of the garden.

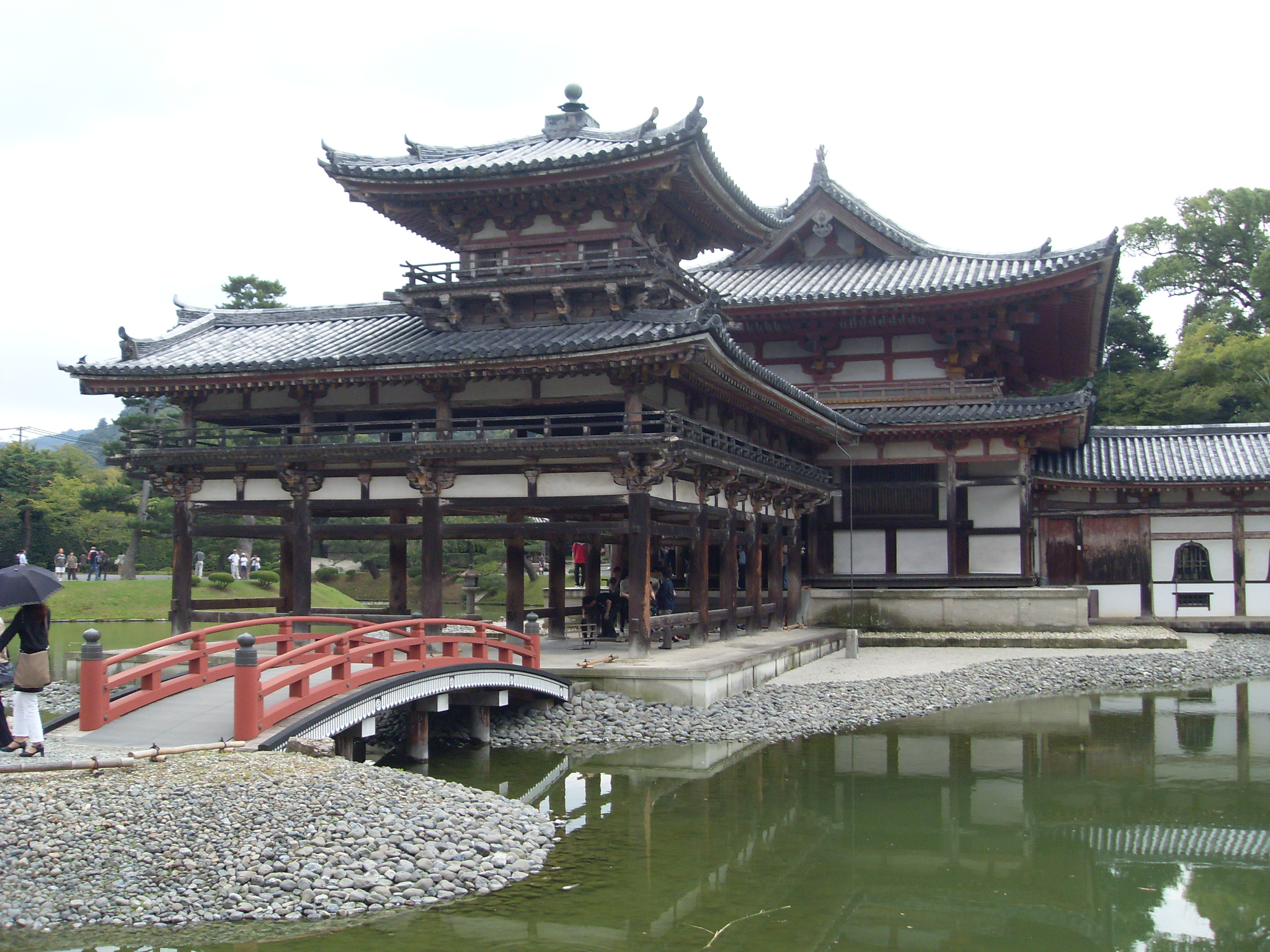
The bridge at Byōdō-in temple (1052) represented the way to the island of the immortals, and paradise.

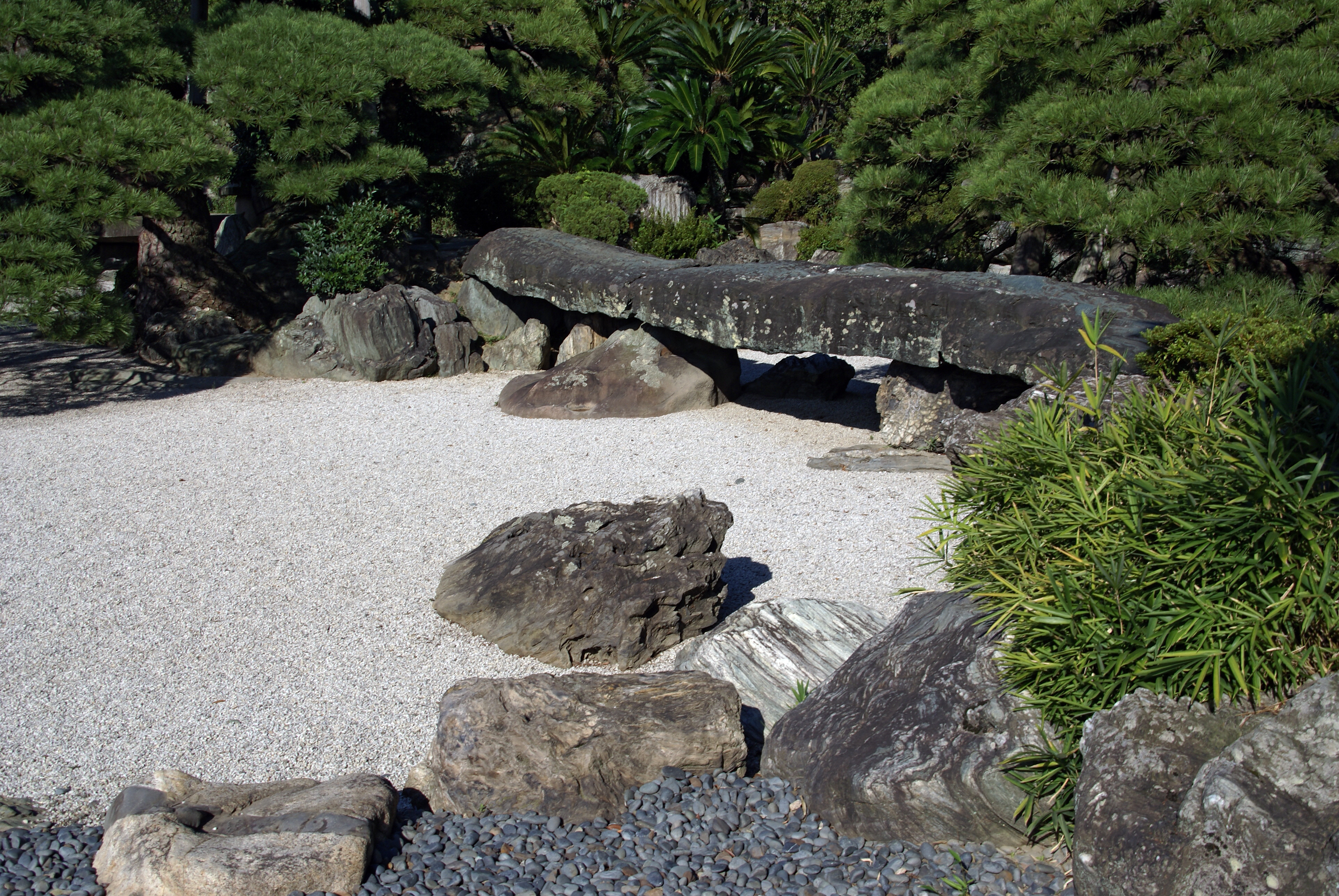
A bridge at Tokushima castle made of two stones resting on a third stone (1592)

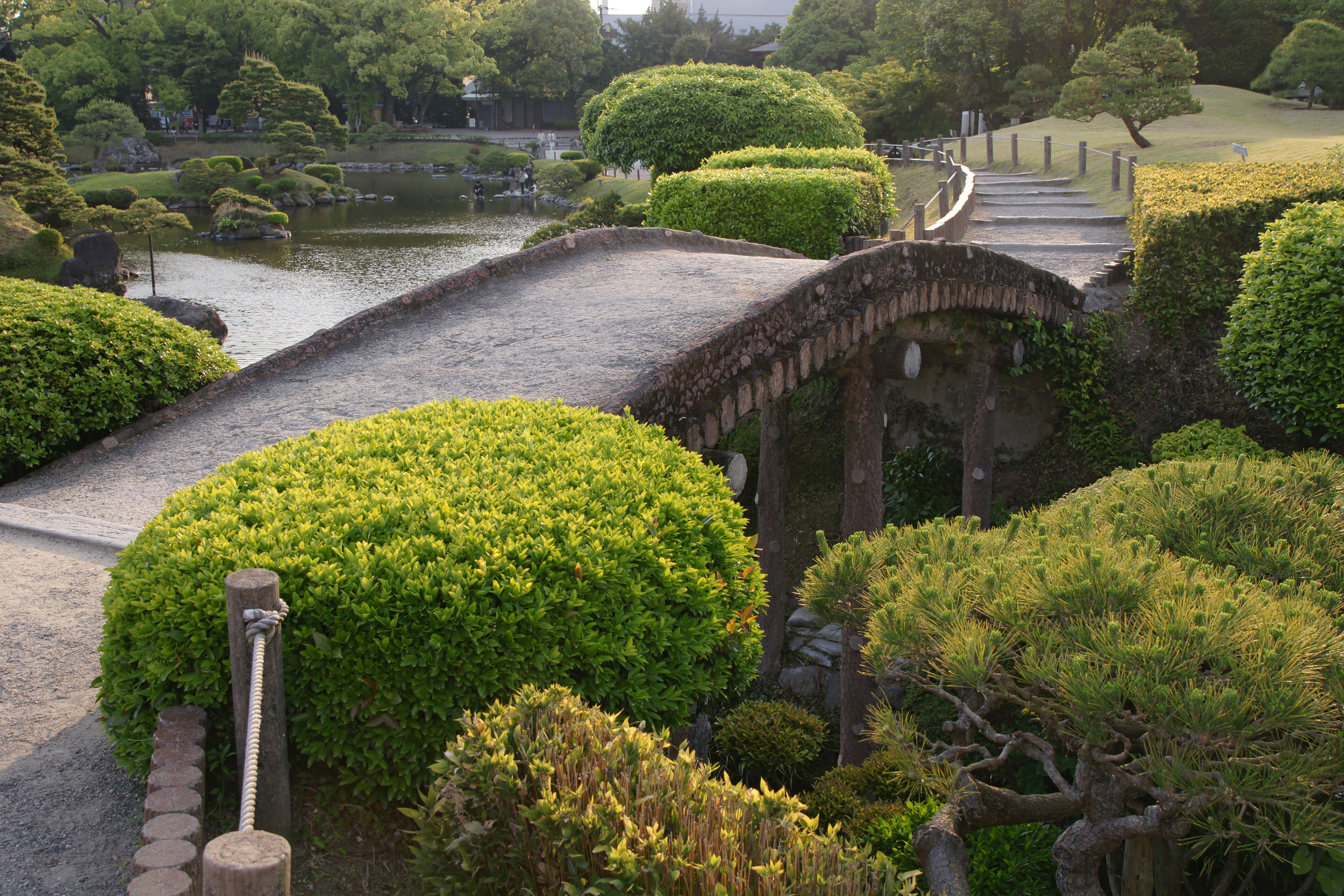
Wood and stone bridge at Suizen-ji garden. The garden was begun in 1636.

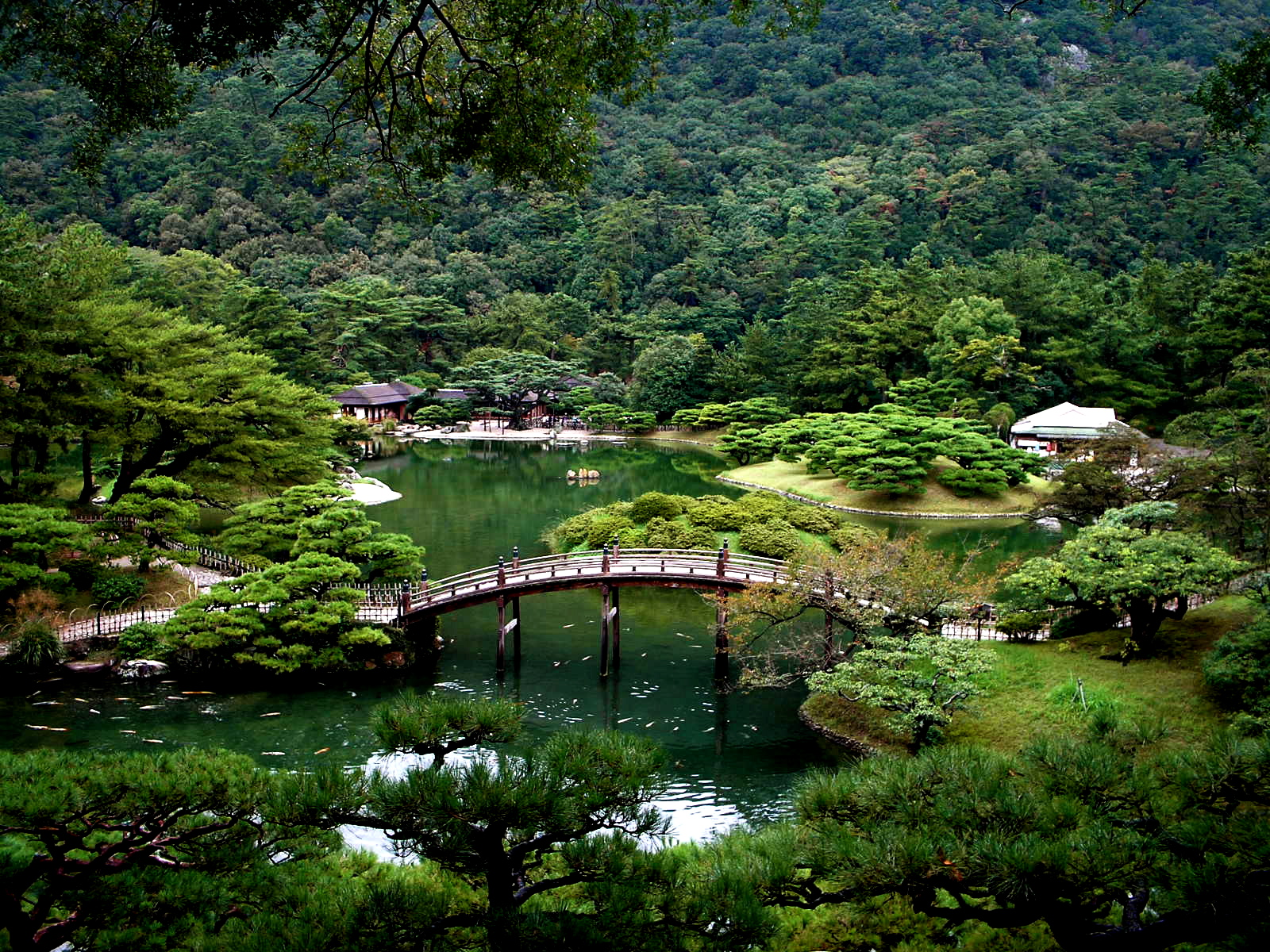
Wooden bridge in Ritsurin Garden (between 1642 and 1745)

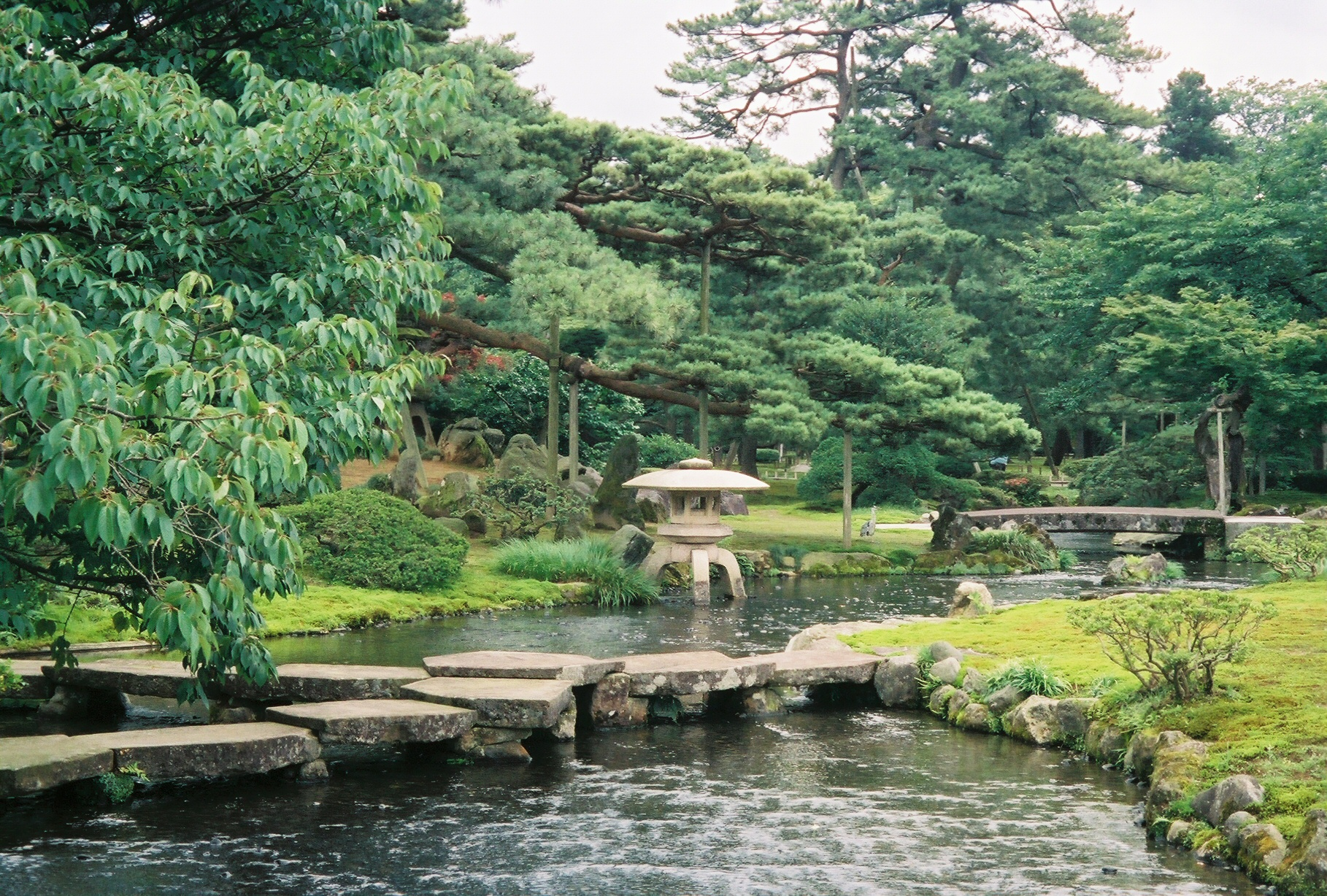
The Flying Geese Bridge in Kenroku-en garden (between 1822 and 1874)

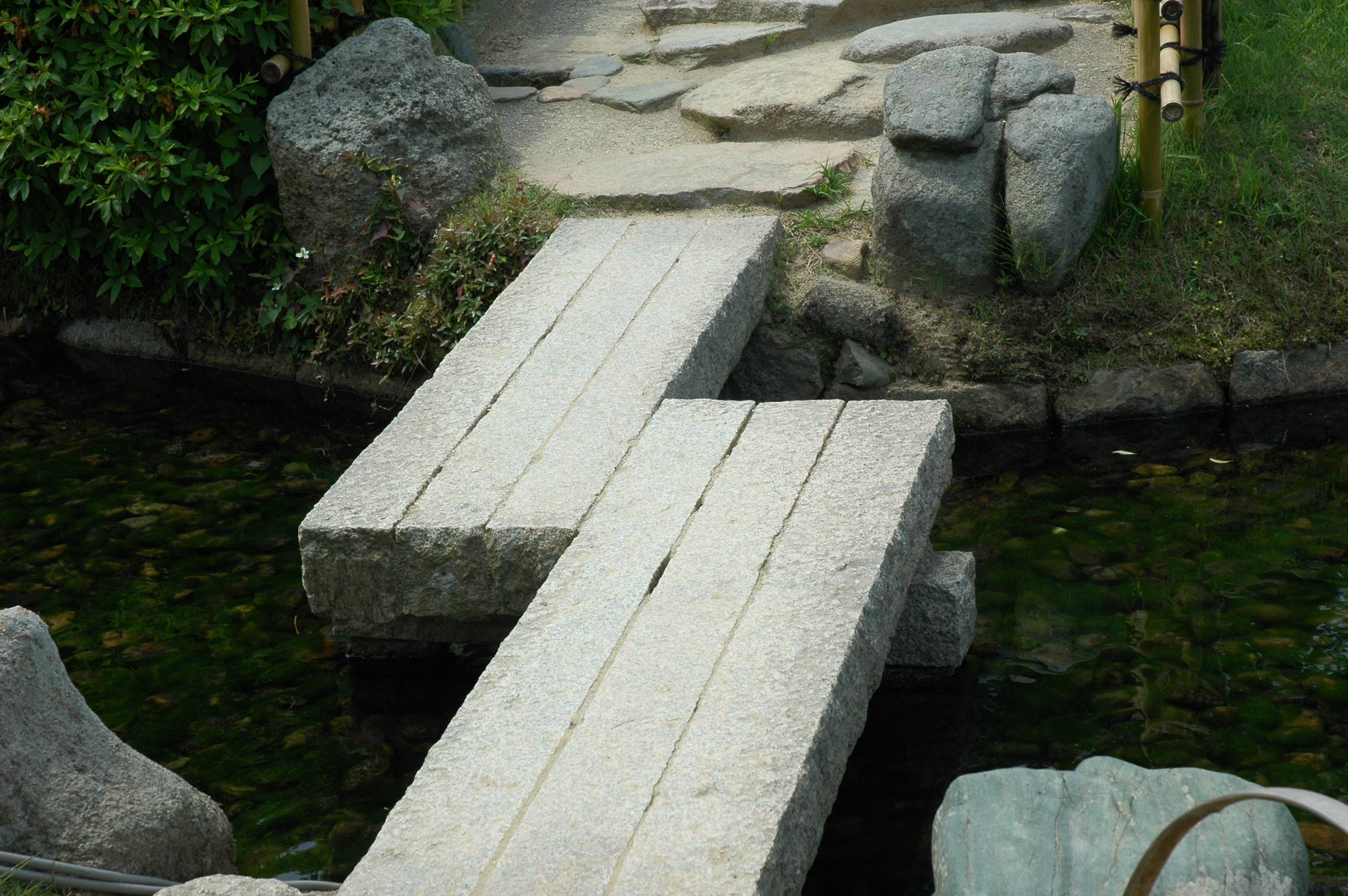
Zig-zag stone bridge in Koishikawa Kōrakuen

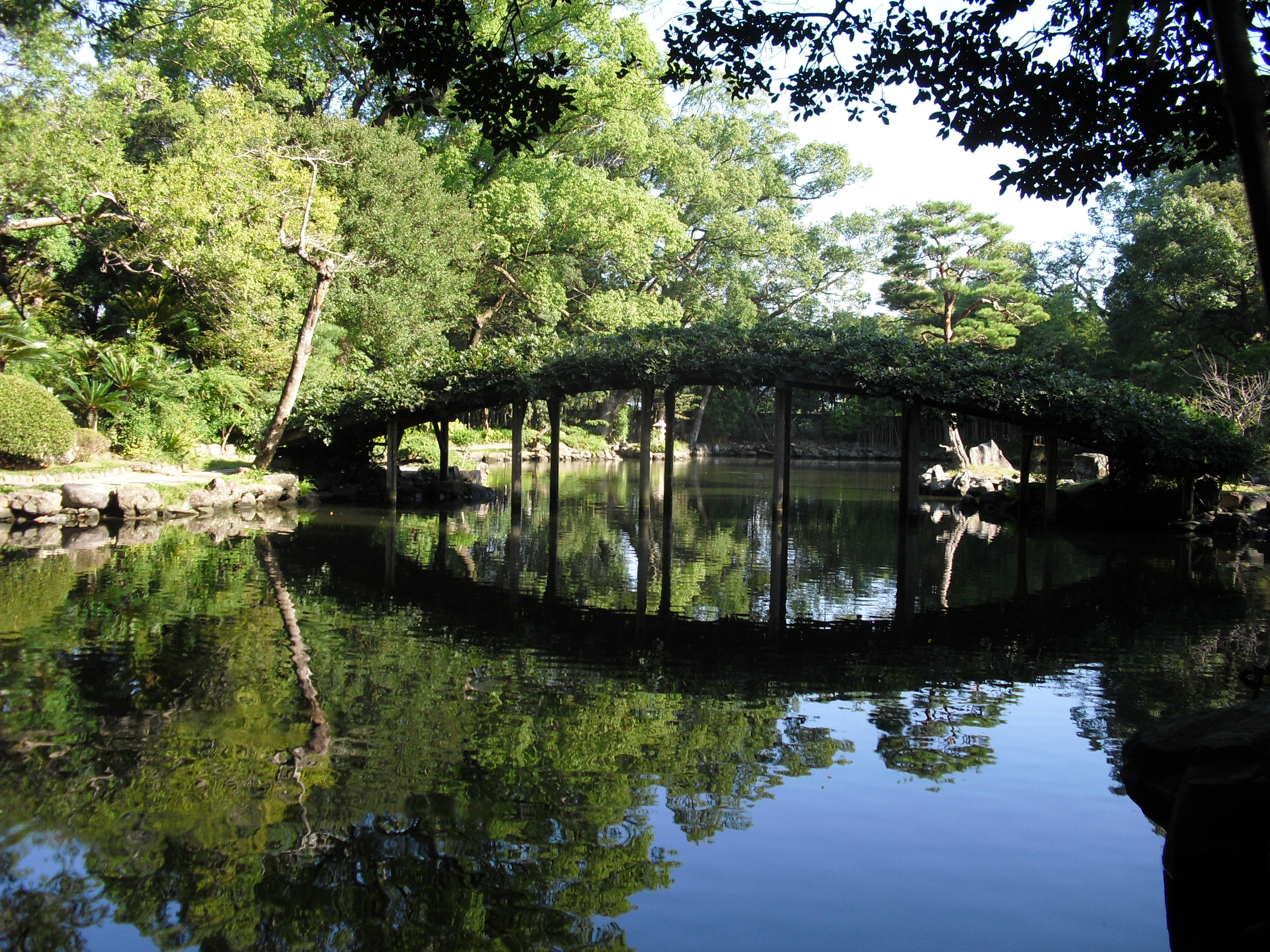
Rustic bridge at Tensha-en garden in Uwajima (1866)

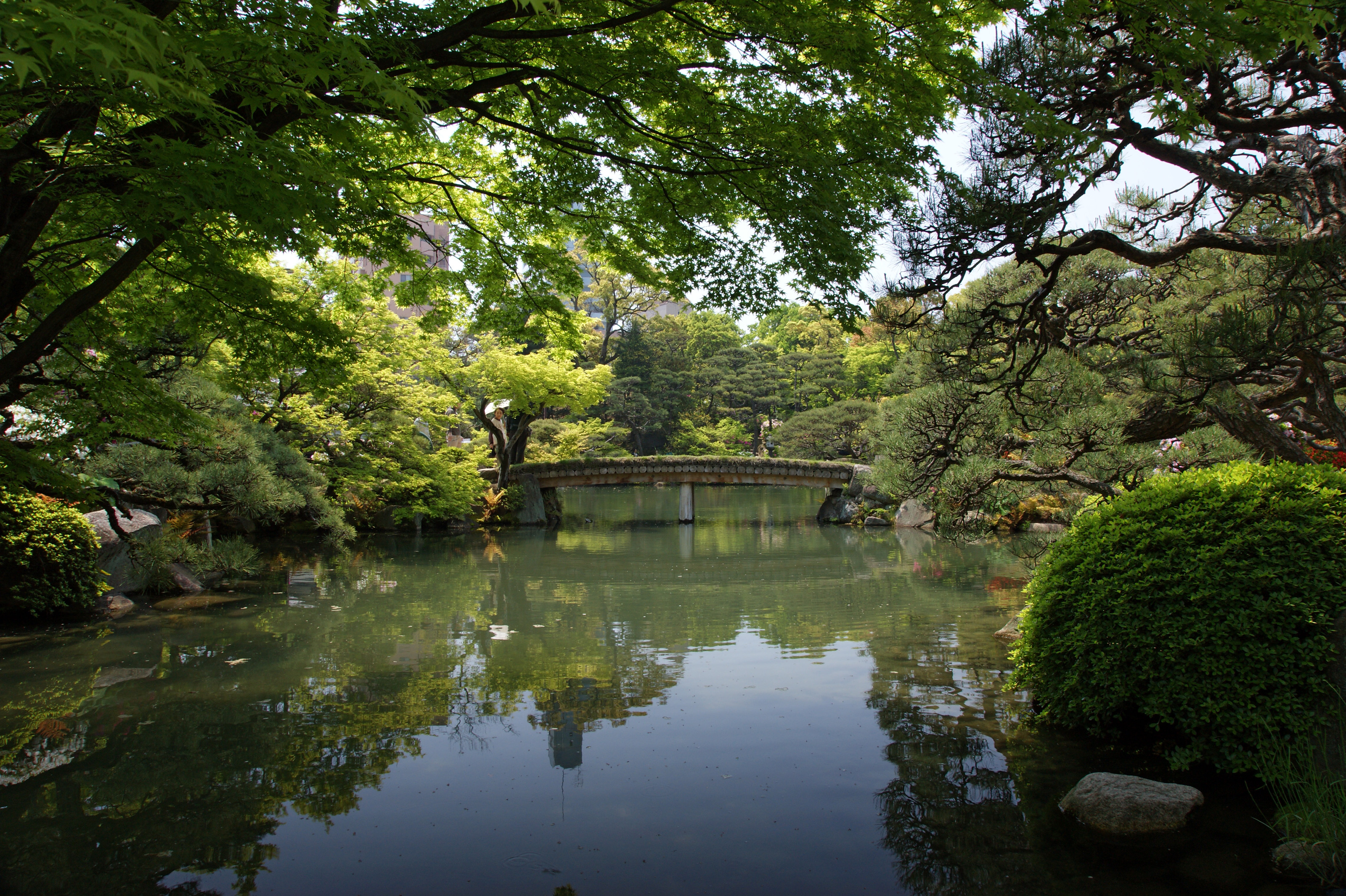
A wooden bridge covered with earth and moss (dobashi) at Sorakuen

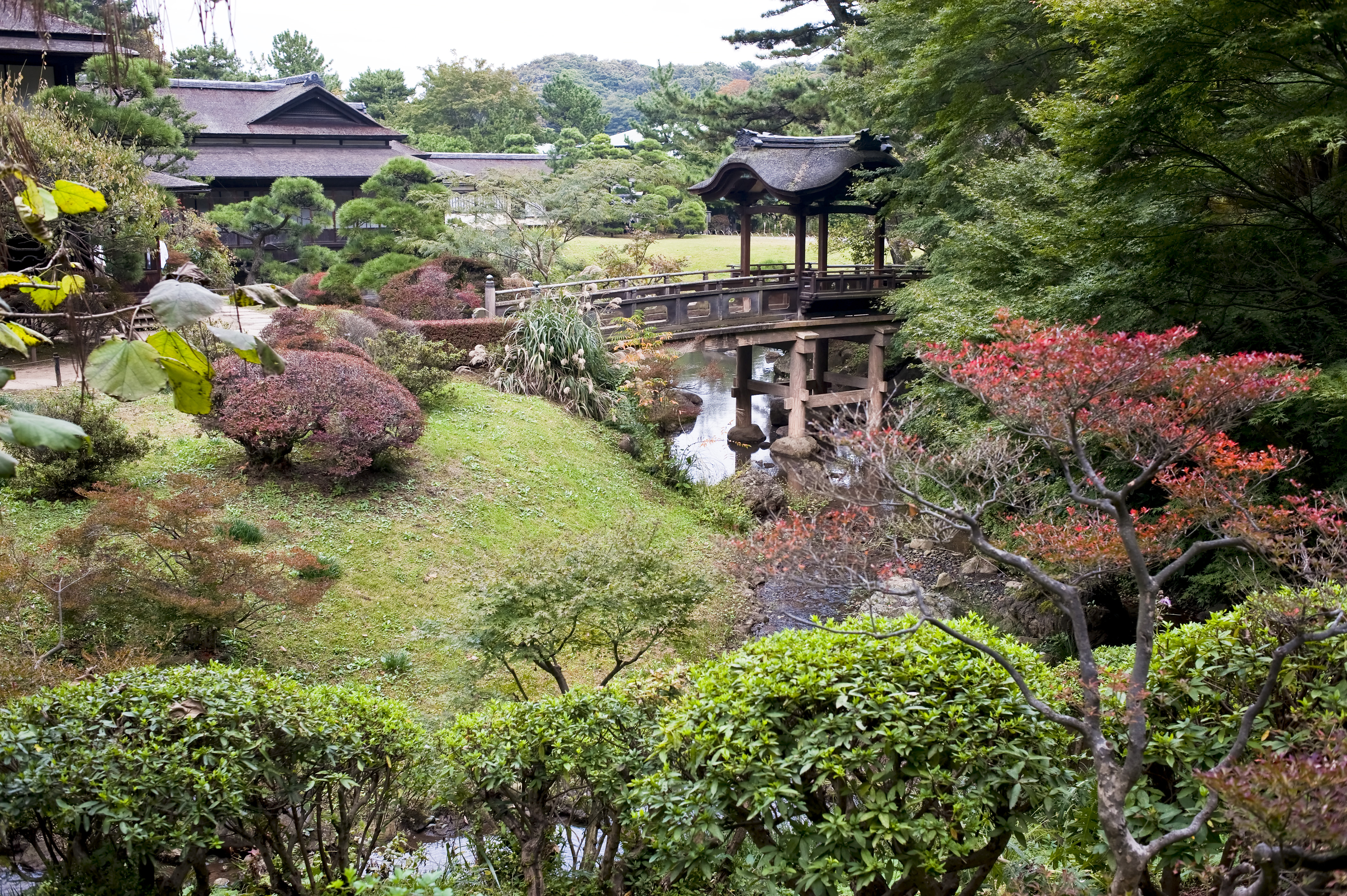
A rare covered bridge from the Sankeien Garden in Yokohama

=== Stone lanterns and water basins ===
Japanese stone lanterns (台灯籠, dai-dōrō; "platform lamp") date back to the Nara period and the Heian period. Originally they were located only at Buddhist temples, where they lined the paths and approaches to the temple, but in the Heian period they began to be used at Shinto shrines as well. According to tradition, during the Momoyama period they were introduced to the tea garden by the first great tea masters, and in later gardens they were used purely for decoration.

In its complete and original form, a dai-dōrō, like the pagoda, represents the five elements of Buddhist cosmology. The piece touching the ground represents chi, the earth; the next section represents sui, or water; ka or fire, is represented by the section encasing the lantern's light or flame, while fū (air) and kū (void or spirit) are represented by the last two sections, top-most and pointing towards the sky. The segments express the idea that after death our physical bodies will go back to their original, elemental form.

Stone water basins (tsukubai) were originally placed in gardens for visitors to wash their hands and mouth before the tea ceremony. The water is provided to the basin by a bamboo pipe, or kakei, and they usually have a wooden ladle for drinking the water. In tea gardens, the basin was placed low to the ground, so the drinker had to bend over to get water.

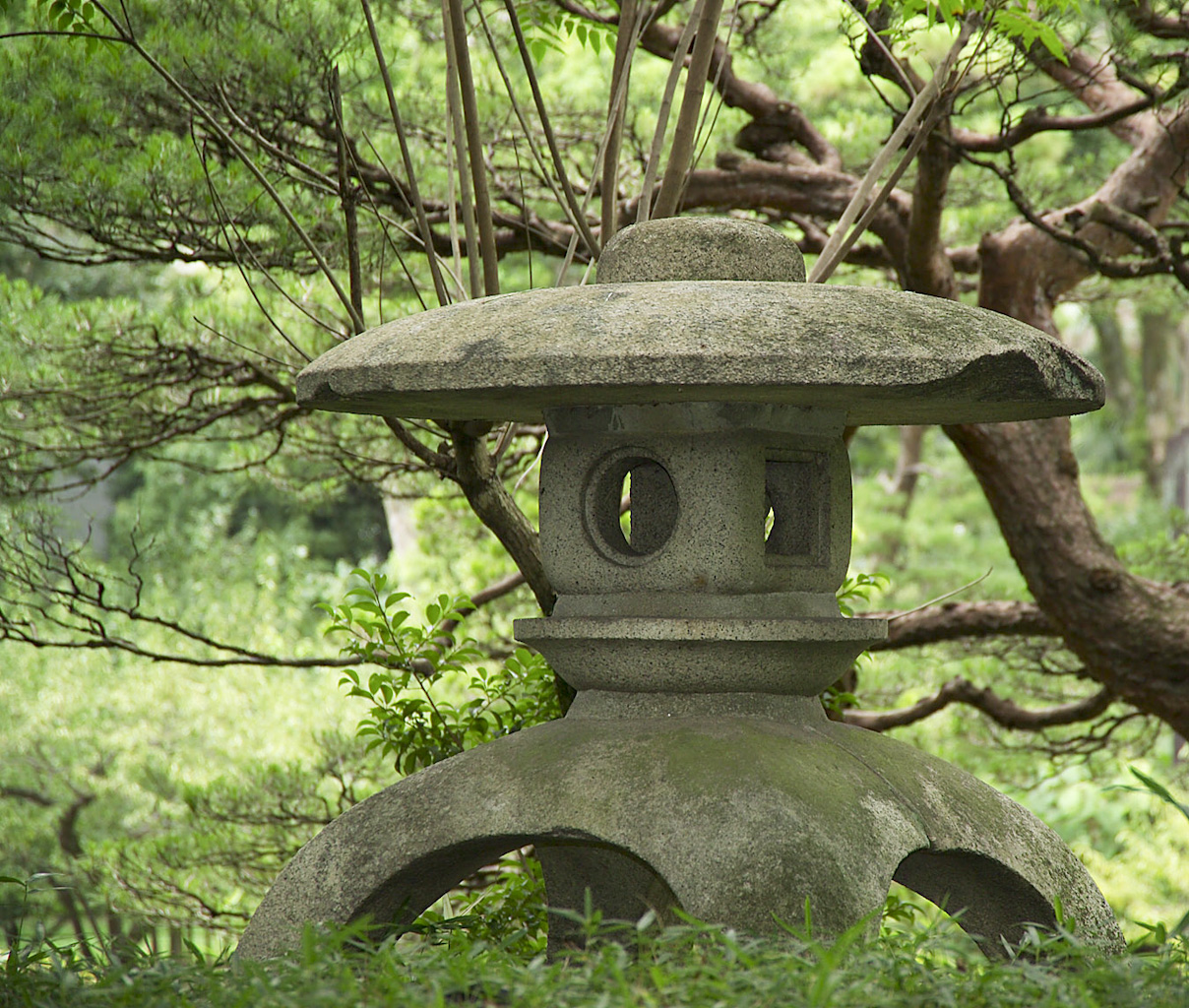
Lantern in Shukkei-en garden in Hiroshima.

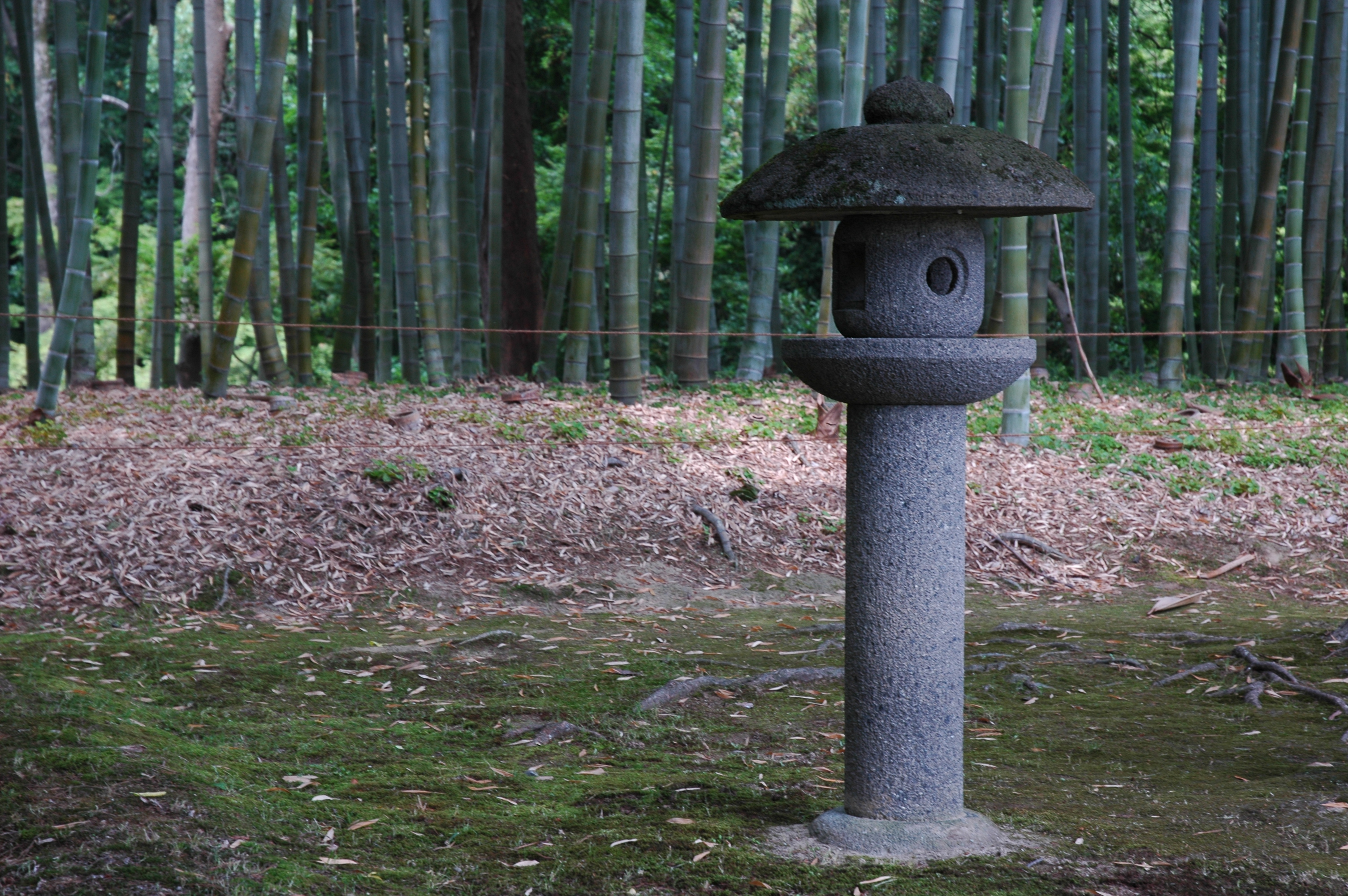
Lantern in Kōraku-en garden

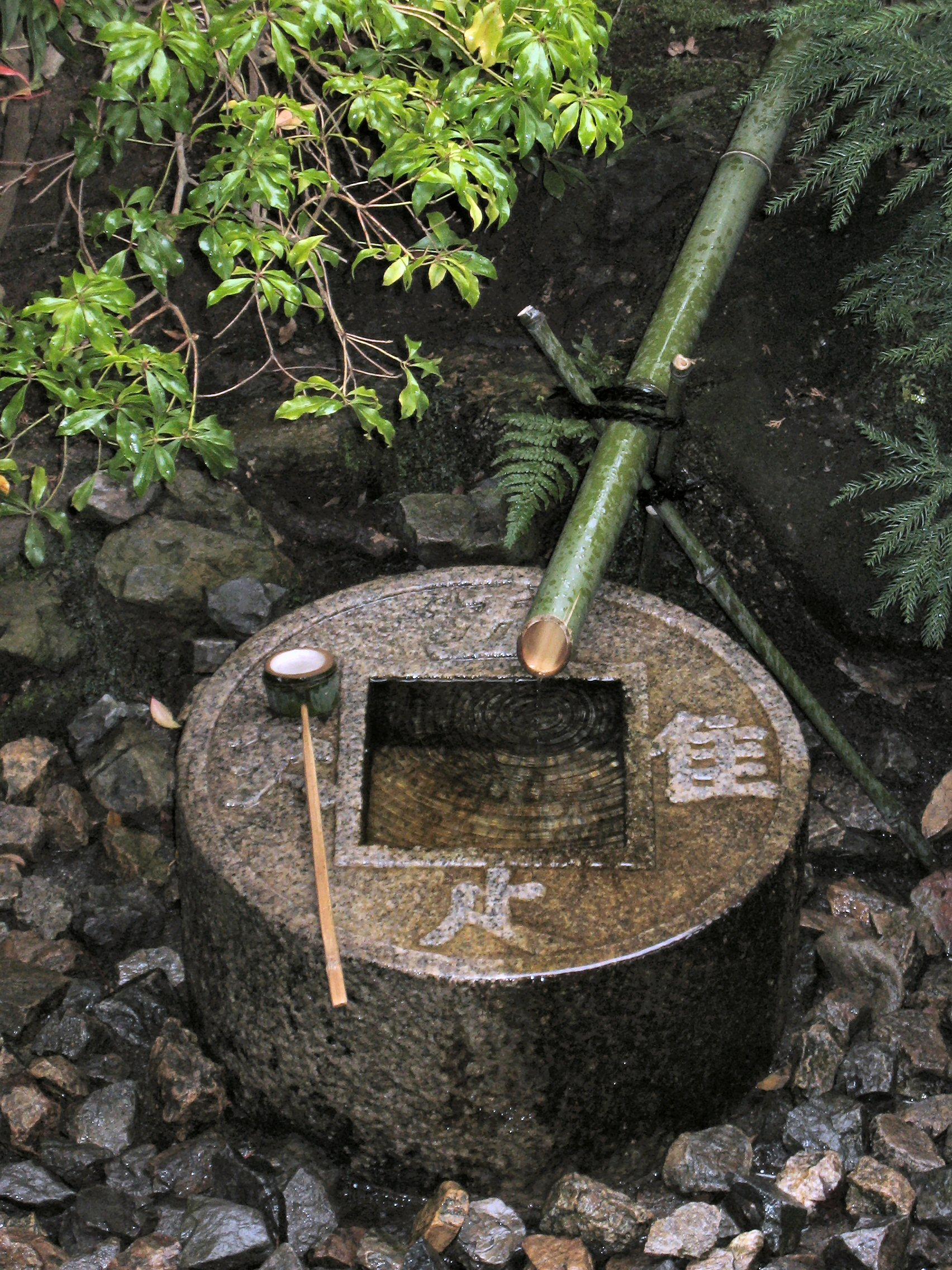
Water basin at Ryōan-ji, Kyoto

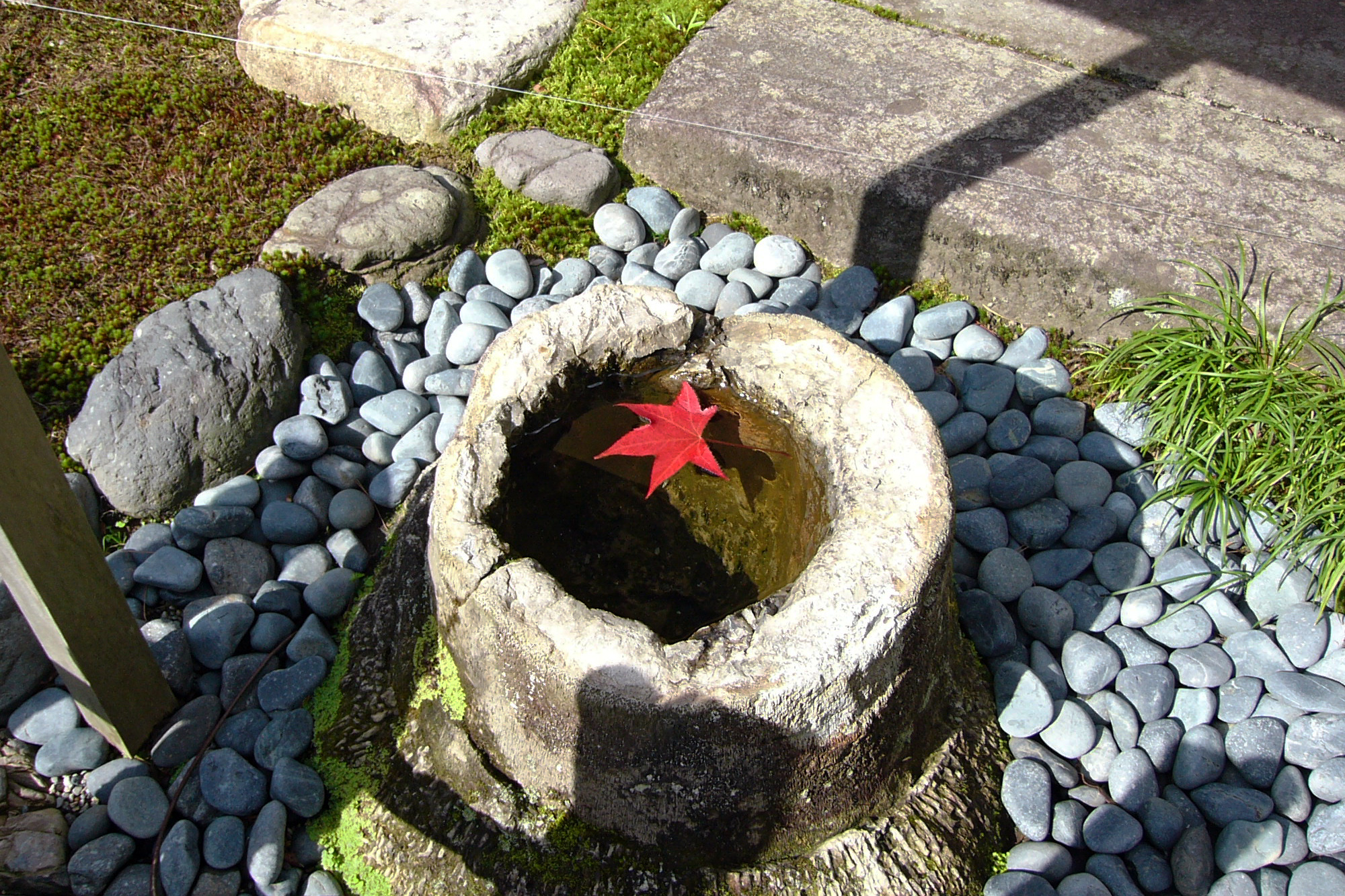
Stone water basin in Kenroku-en garden.

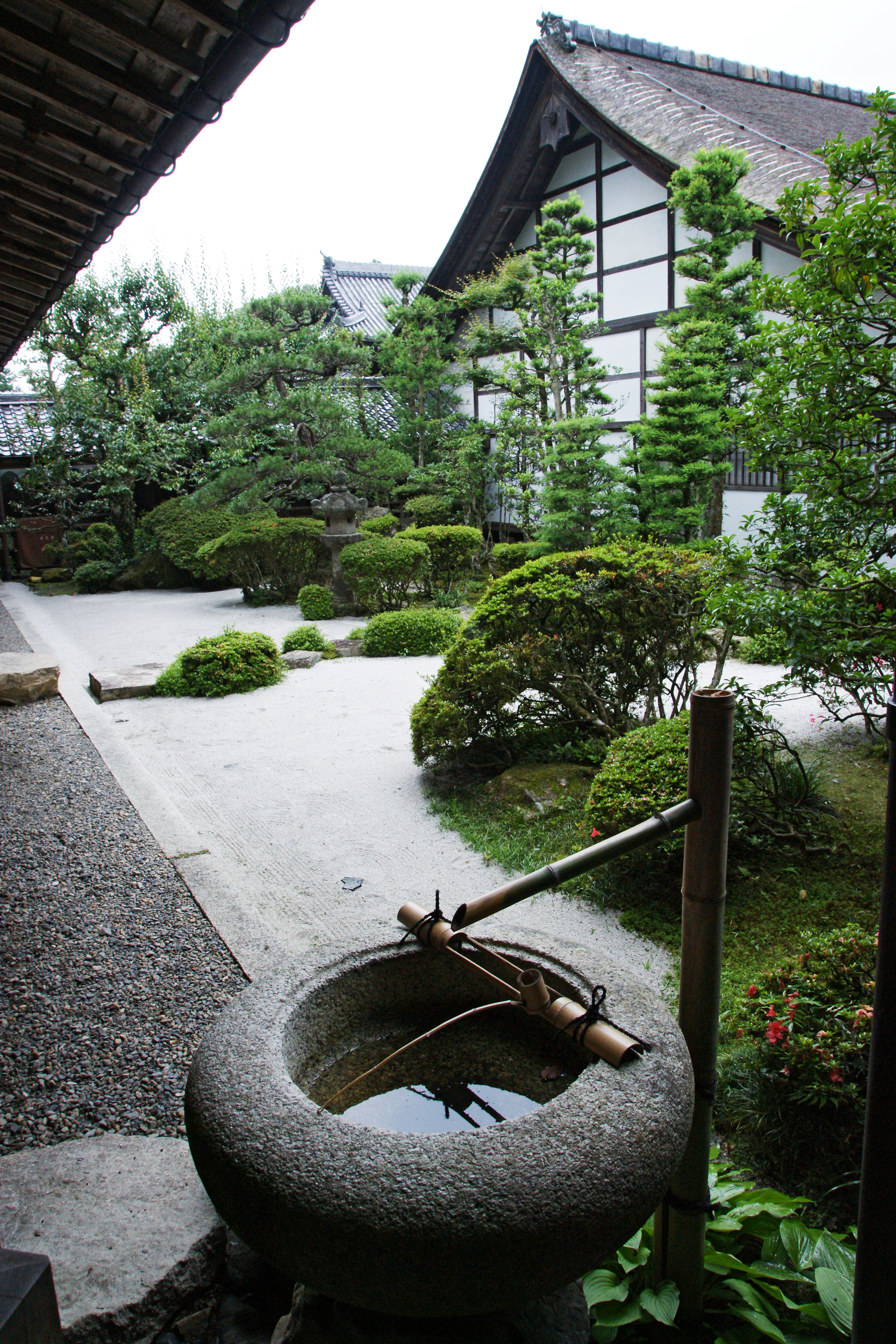
Stone water basin in Sakamotu, Ōtsu, Shiga

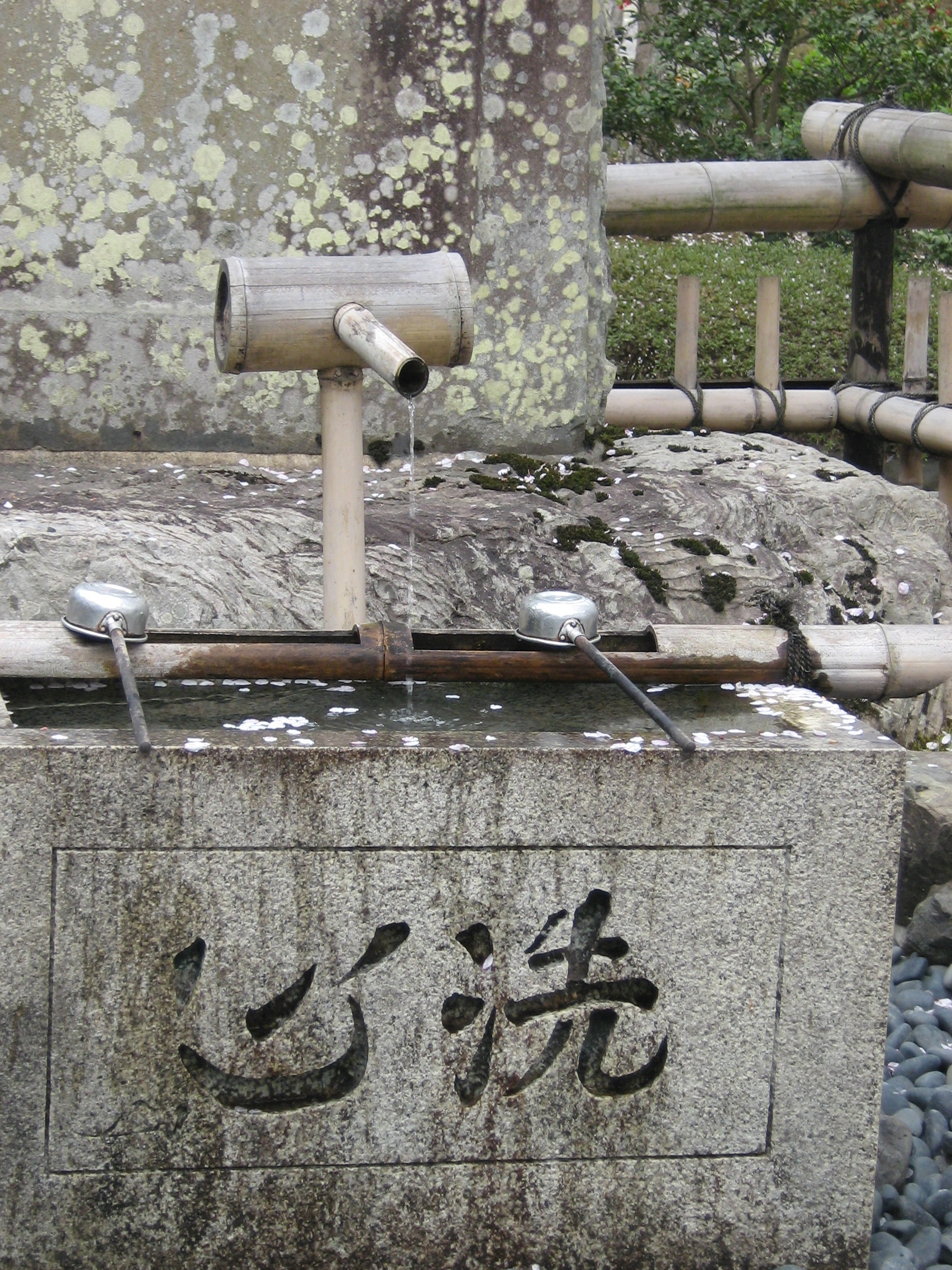
Water basin at Tenryū-ji Temple in Kyoto

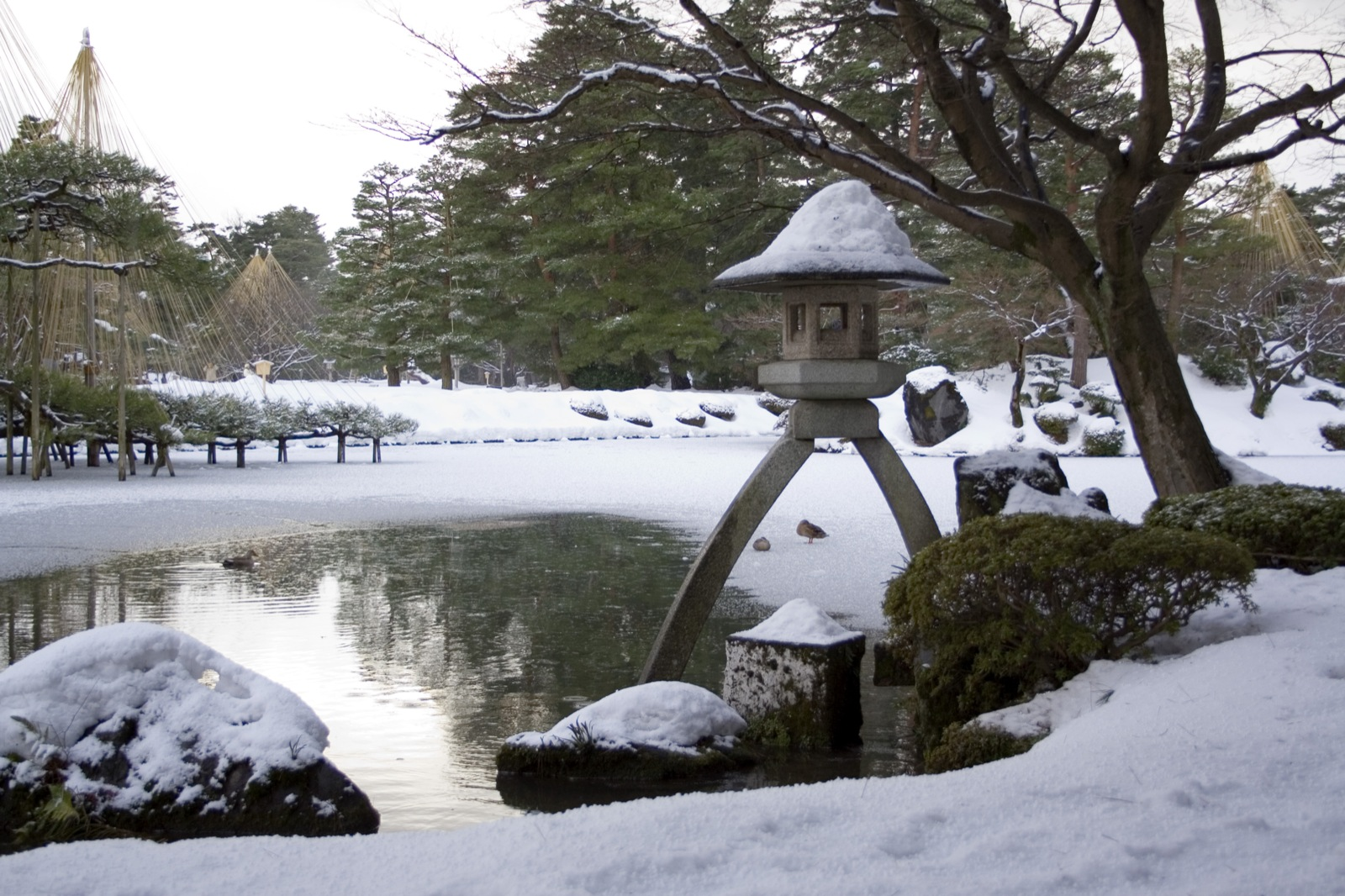
Snow lanterns, like this one in Kenroku-en garden, have wide brims which catch the snow, to create picturesque scenes.

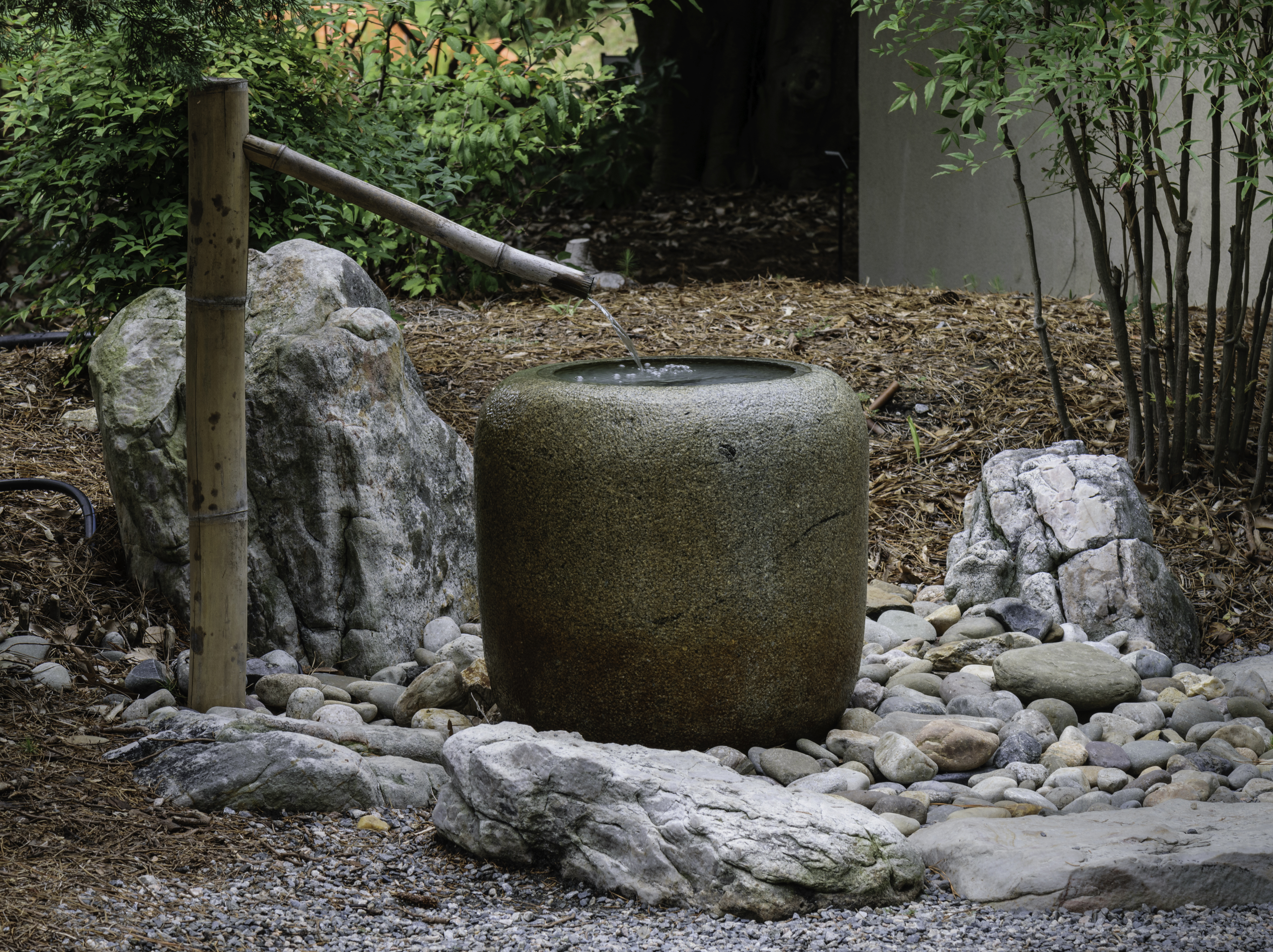
Stone water fountain and cistern at the Japanese Garden at Norfolk Botanical Garden, Norfolk, Virginia

=== Garden fences, gates, and devices ===
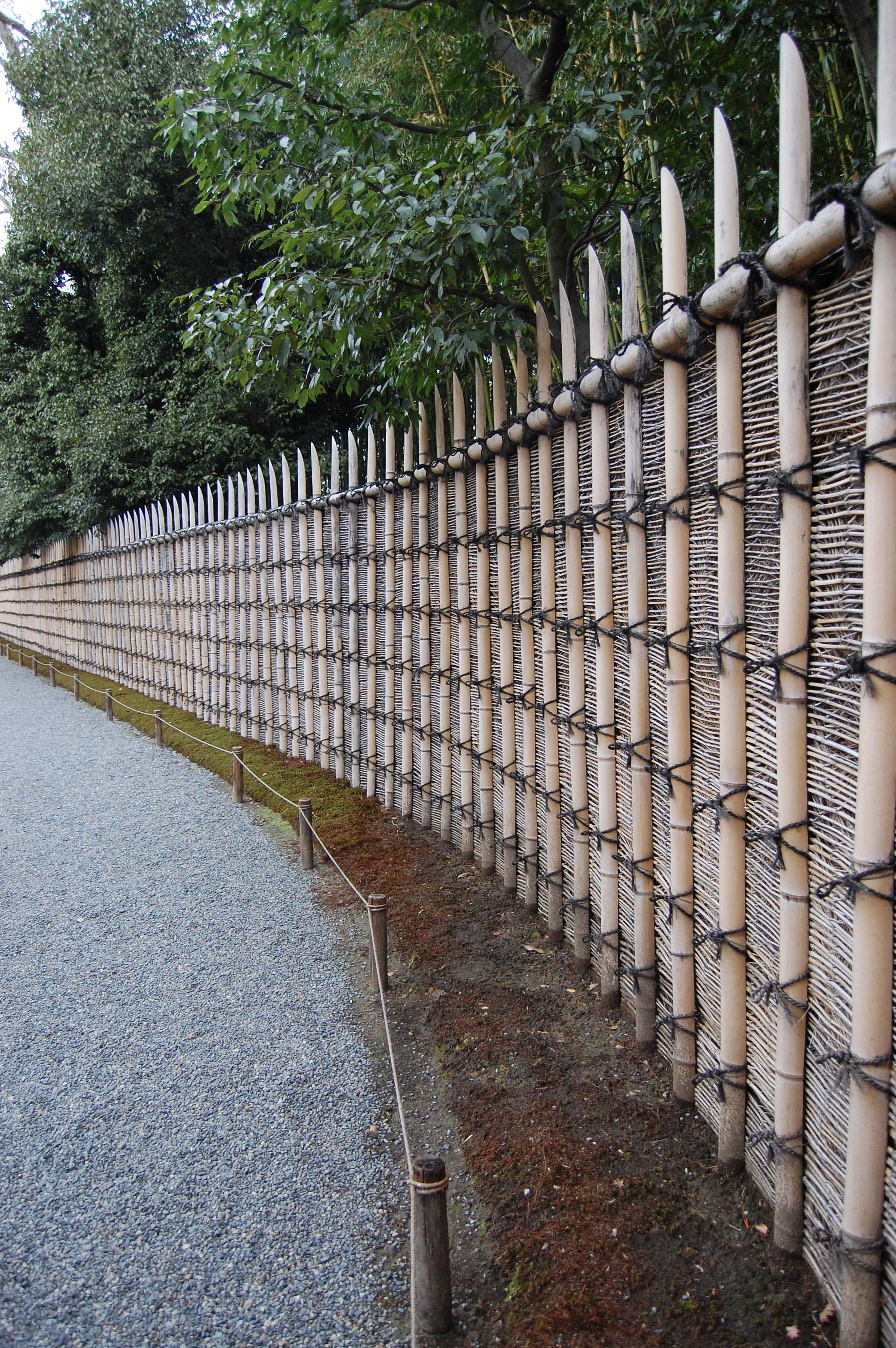
The exterior wall of Katsura Imperial Villa, designed, like all the garden, for purity and simplicity

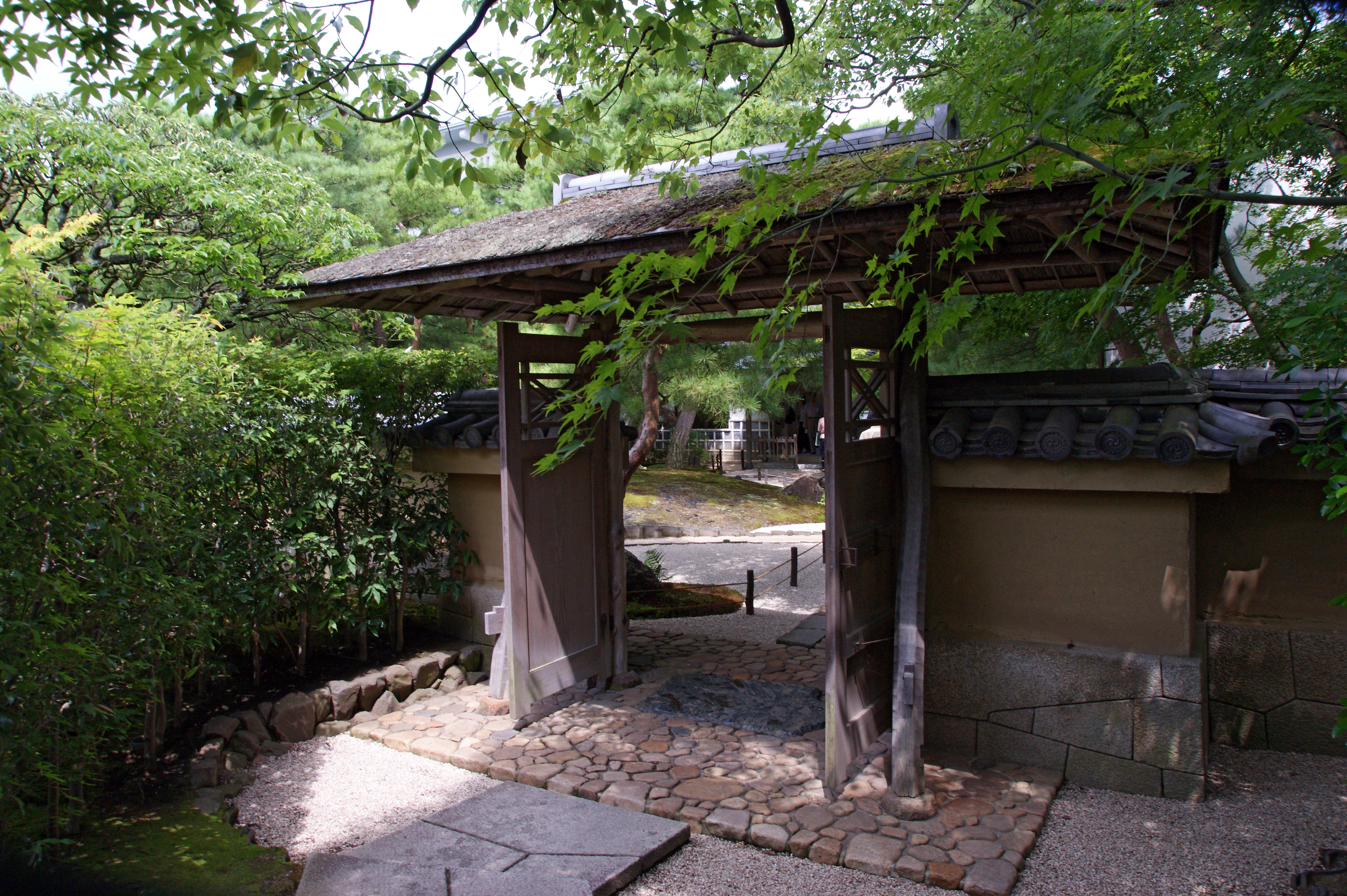
The traditional garden gate of the Adachi Museum of Art

A shishi-odoshi is garden device, made of bamboo and wood, designed to scare away birds. As the bamboo tube fills with water, it clacks against a stone, empties, then fills with water again.

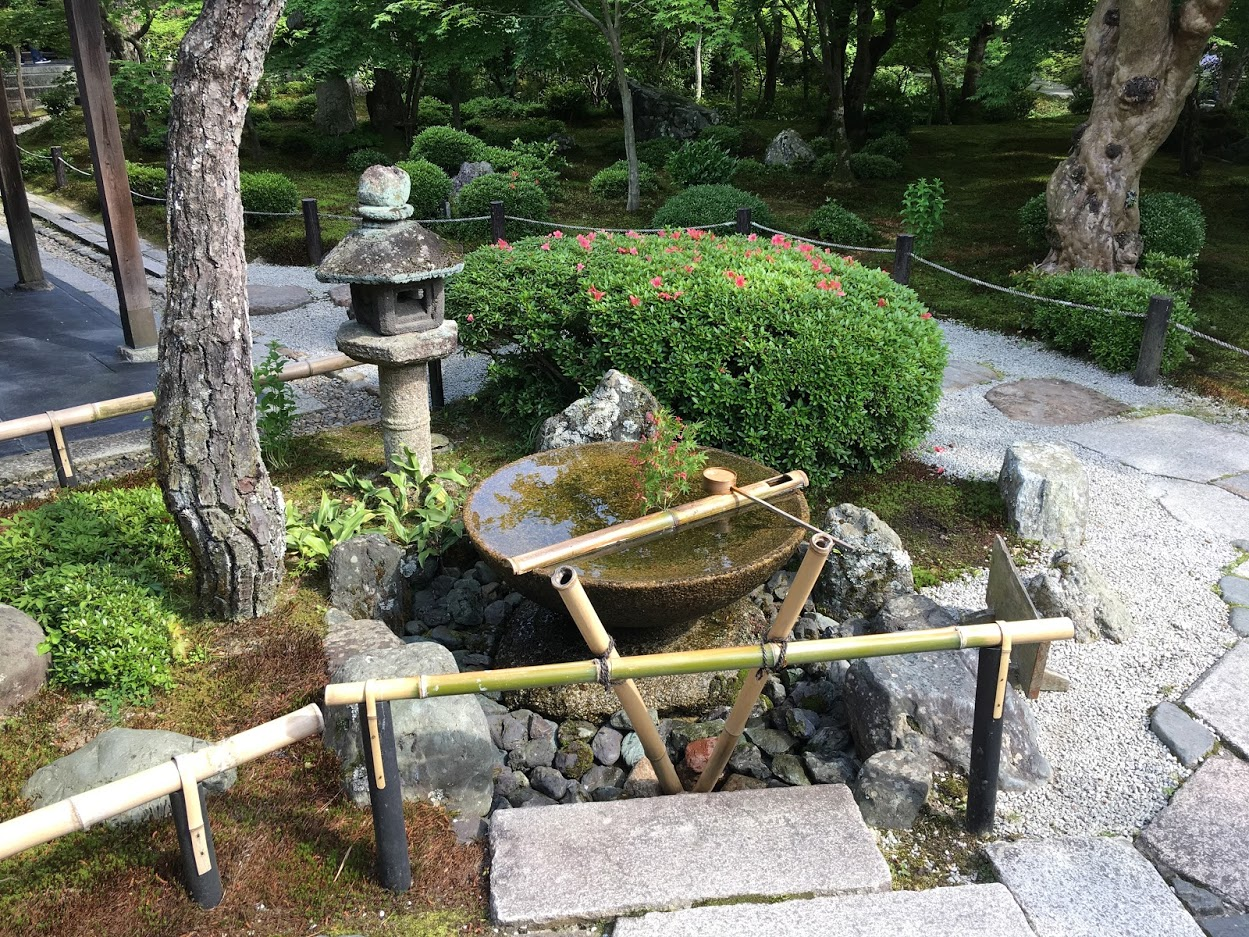
The suikinkutsu is a subtle garden instrument hidden beneath the gravel in some water basins.

=== Trees and flowers ===
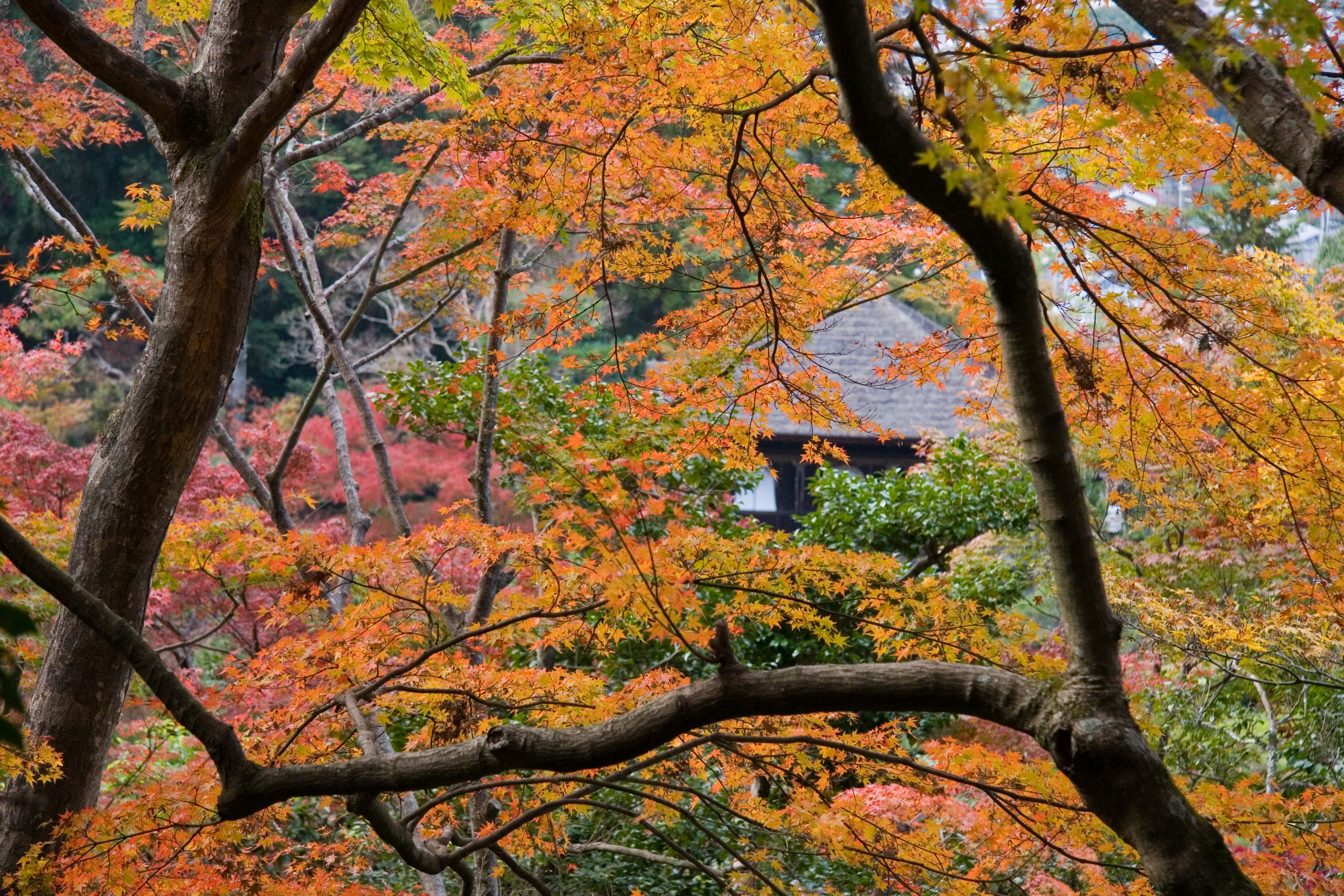
Japanese maple in the temple of Ginkaku-ji, Kyoto

Nothing in a Japanese garden is natural or left to chance; each plant is chosen according to aesthetic principles, either to hide undesirable sights, to serve as a backdrop to certain garden features, or to create a picturesque scene. Trees are carefully chosen and arranged for their autumn colors. Moss is often used to suggest that the garden is ancient. Flowers are also carefully chosen by their season of flowering. Formal flowerbeds are rare in older gardens, but more common in modern gardens. Some plants are chosen for their religious symbolism, such as the lotus, sacred in Buddhist teachings, or the pine, which represents longevity.

The trees are carefully trimmed to provide attractive scenes, and to prevent them from blocking other views of the garden. Their growth is also controlled, in a technique called niwaki, to give them more picturesque shapes, and to make them look more ancient. It has been suggested that the characteristic shape of pruned Japanese garden trees resemble trees found naturally in savannah landscapes. This resemblance has been used to motivate the so-called Savannah hypothesis. Trees are sometimes constrained to bend, in order to provide shadows or better reflections in the water. Very old pine trees are often supported by wooden crutches called tsurazue or hōdzue shichū, or their branches are held by cords, to keep them from breaking under the weight of snow.

In the late 16th century, a new art was developed in the Japanese garden; that of ōkarikomi (大刈込), the technique of trimming bushes into balls or rounded shapes which imitate waves. According to tradition this art was developed by Kobori Enshū (1579–1647), and it was most frequently practiced on azalea bushes. It was similar to the topiary gardens made in Europe at the same time, except that European topiary gardens tried to make trees look like geometric solid objects, while ōkarikomi sought to make bushes look as if they were almost liquid, or in flowing natural shapes. It created an artistic play of light on the surface of the bush, and, according to garden historian Michel Baridon, "it also brought into play the sense of 'touching things' which even today succeeds so well in Japanese design."

The most common trees and plants found in Japanese gardens are the rhododendron, the camellia, the oak (particularly Quercus dentata), the elm, the Chinese flowering plum (ume), sakura, maple, the willow, the ginkgo, the Japanese cypress, the Japanese cedar, pine, and bamboo.

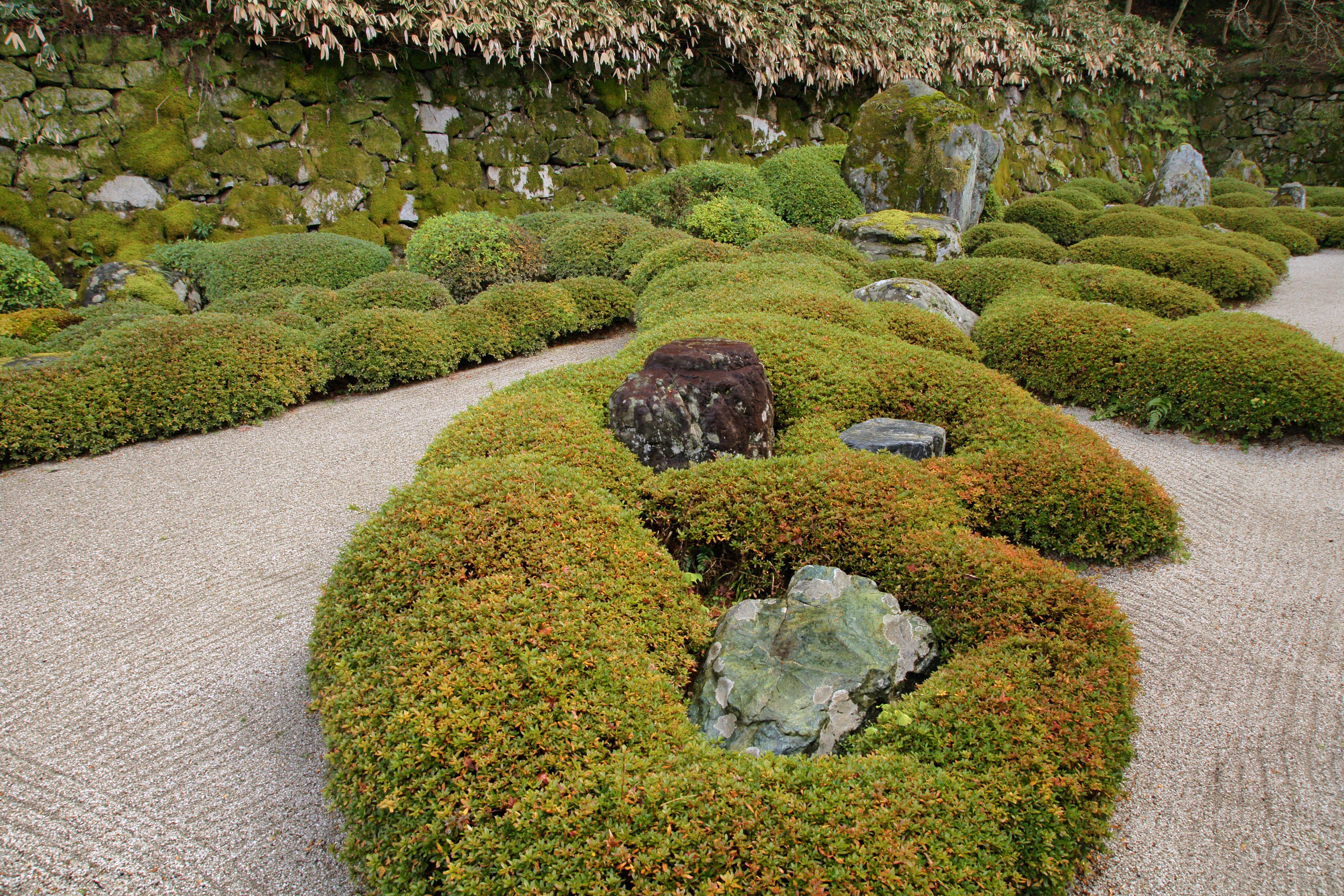
The style of topiary plant sculpture known as ōkarikomi in Chionin Garden

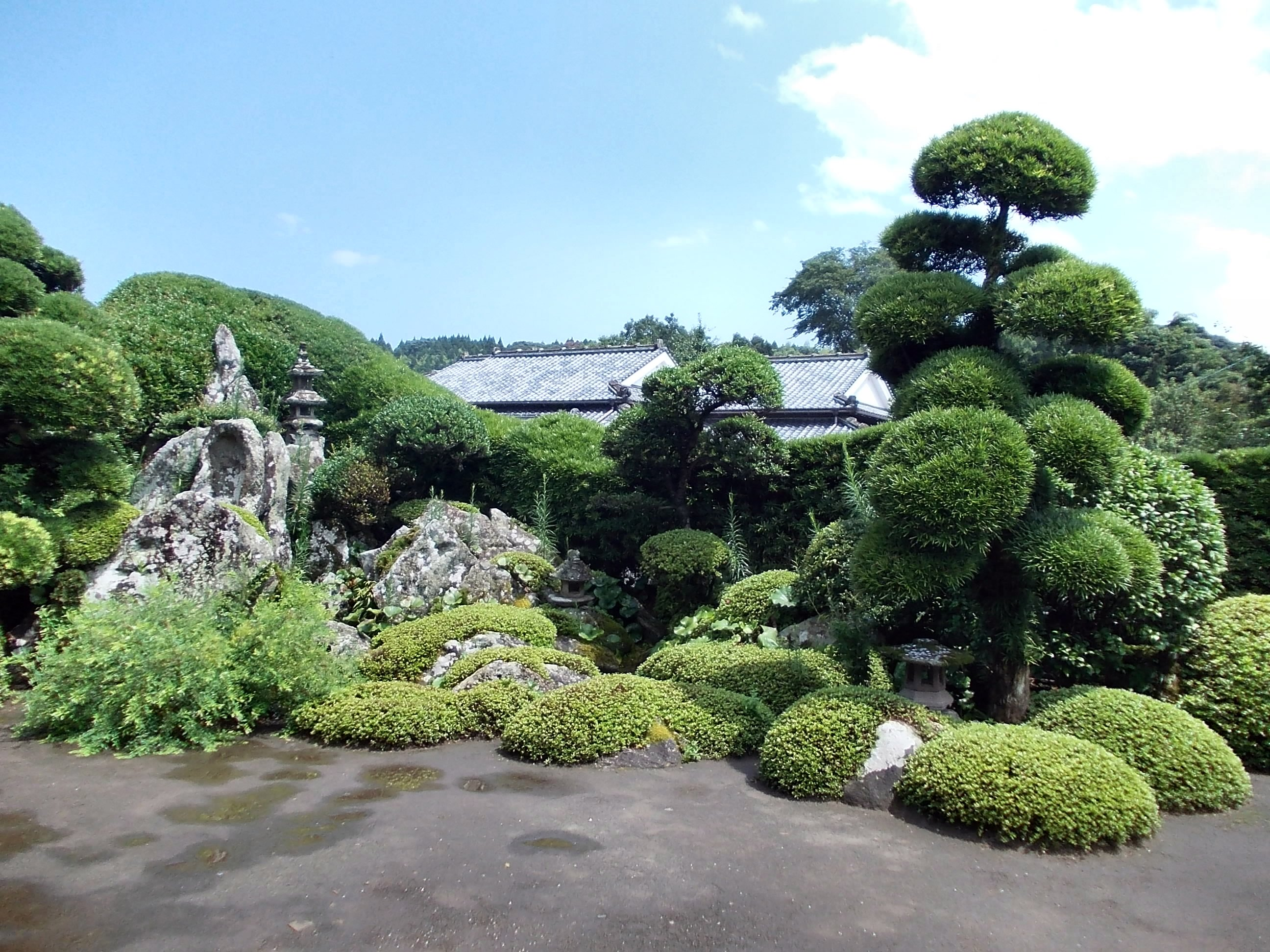
Ōkarikomi sculpted trees and bushes at Chiran Samurai Residence

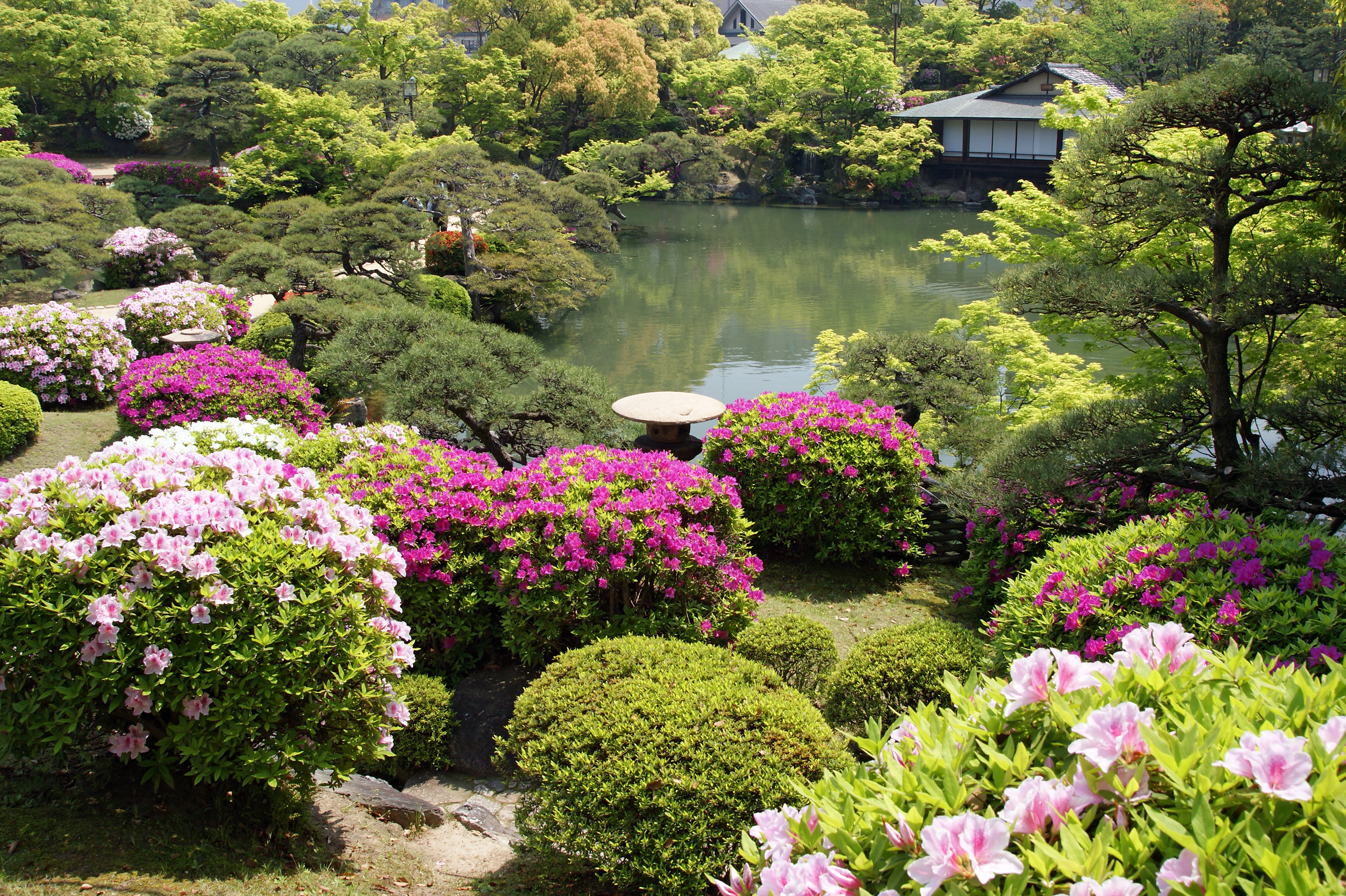
Azaleas at Soraku-en Garden

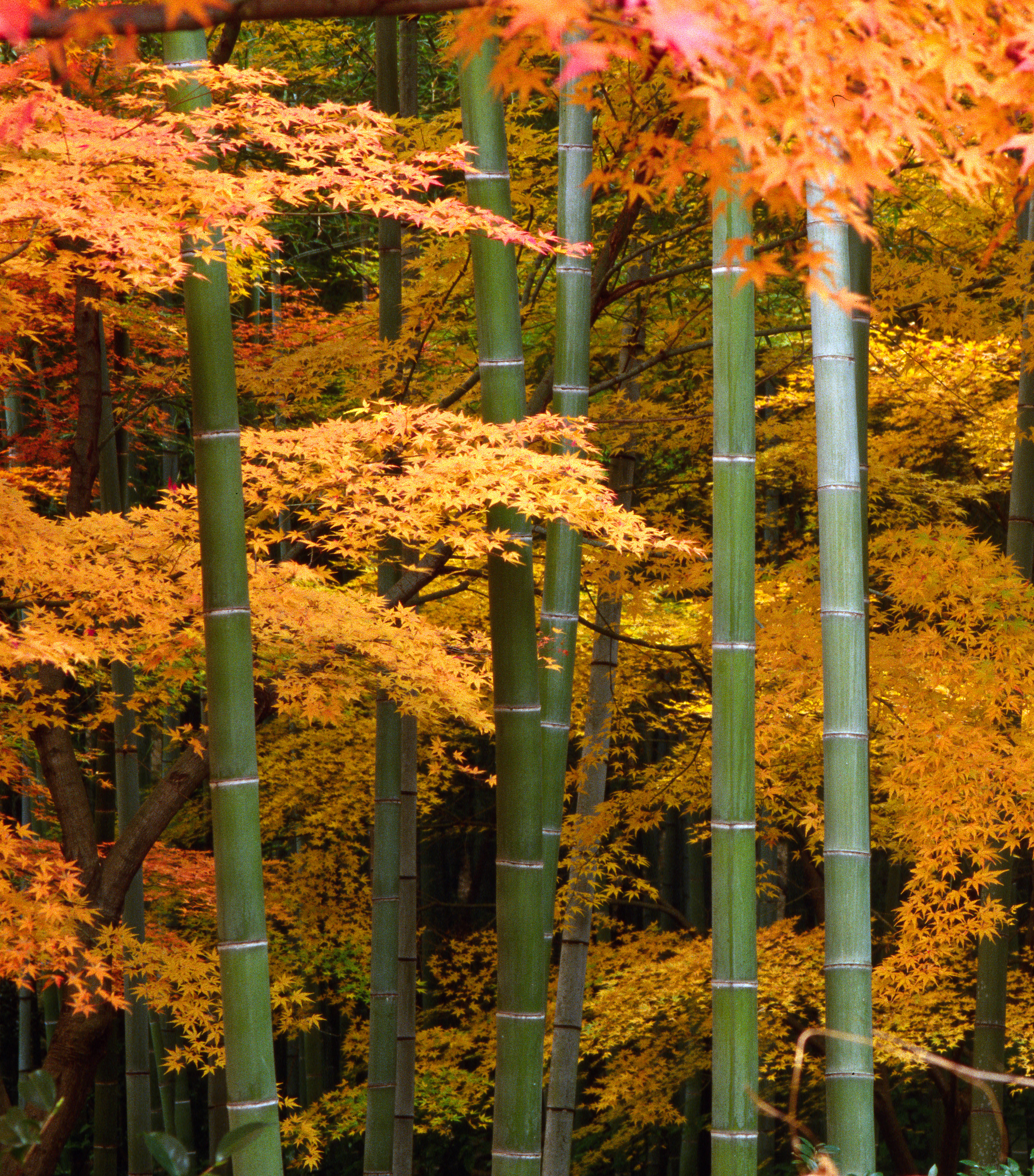
Bamboo and Japanese maple combined at Tenryū-ji Garden in Kyoto

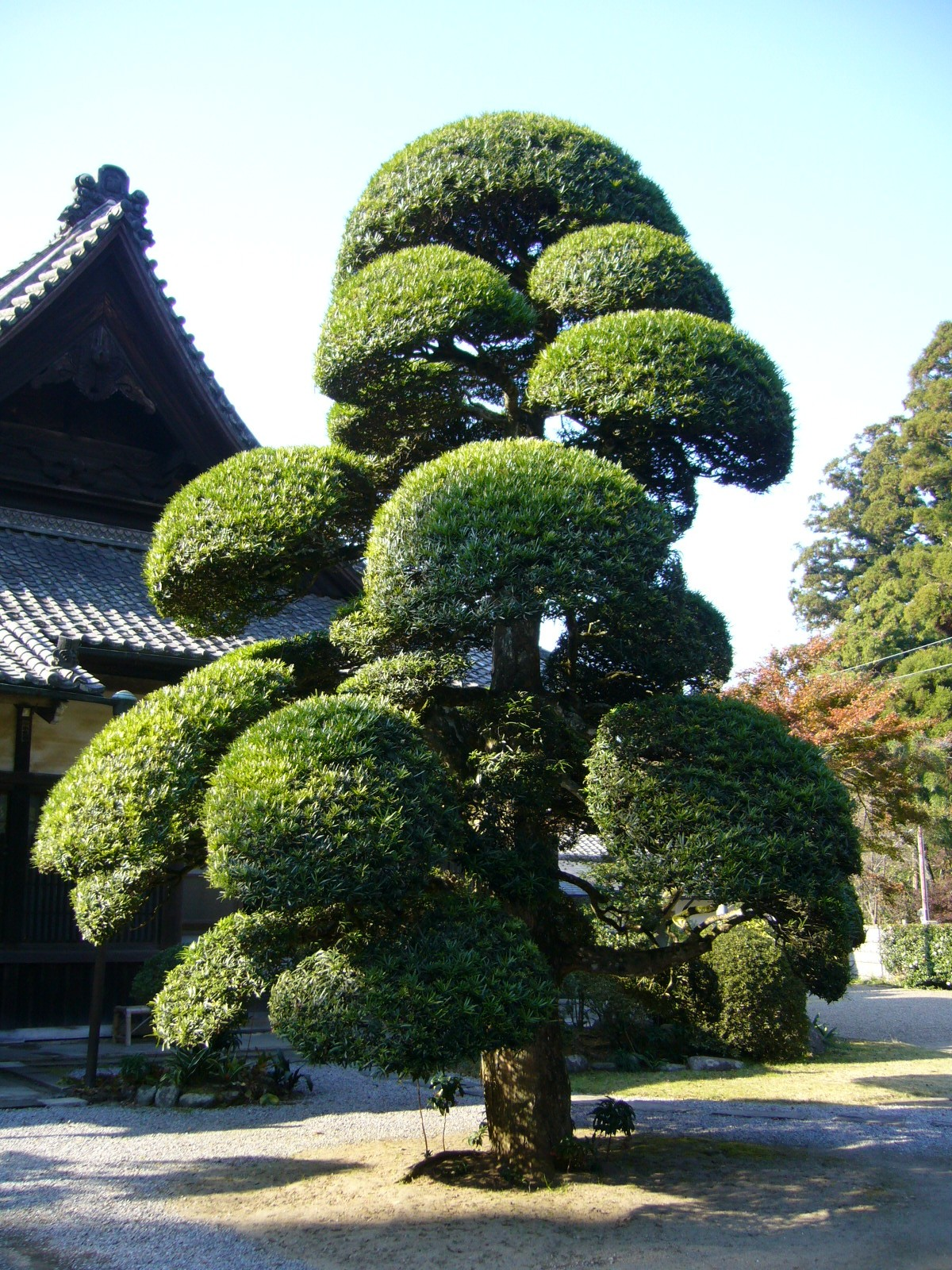
Cloud tree at Katori

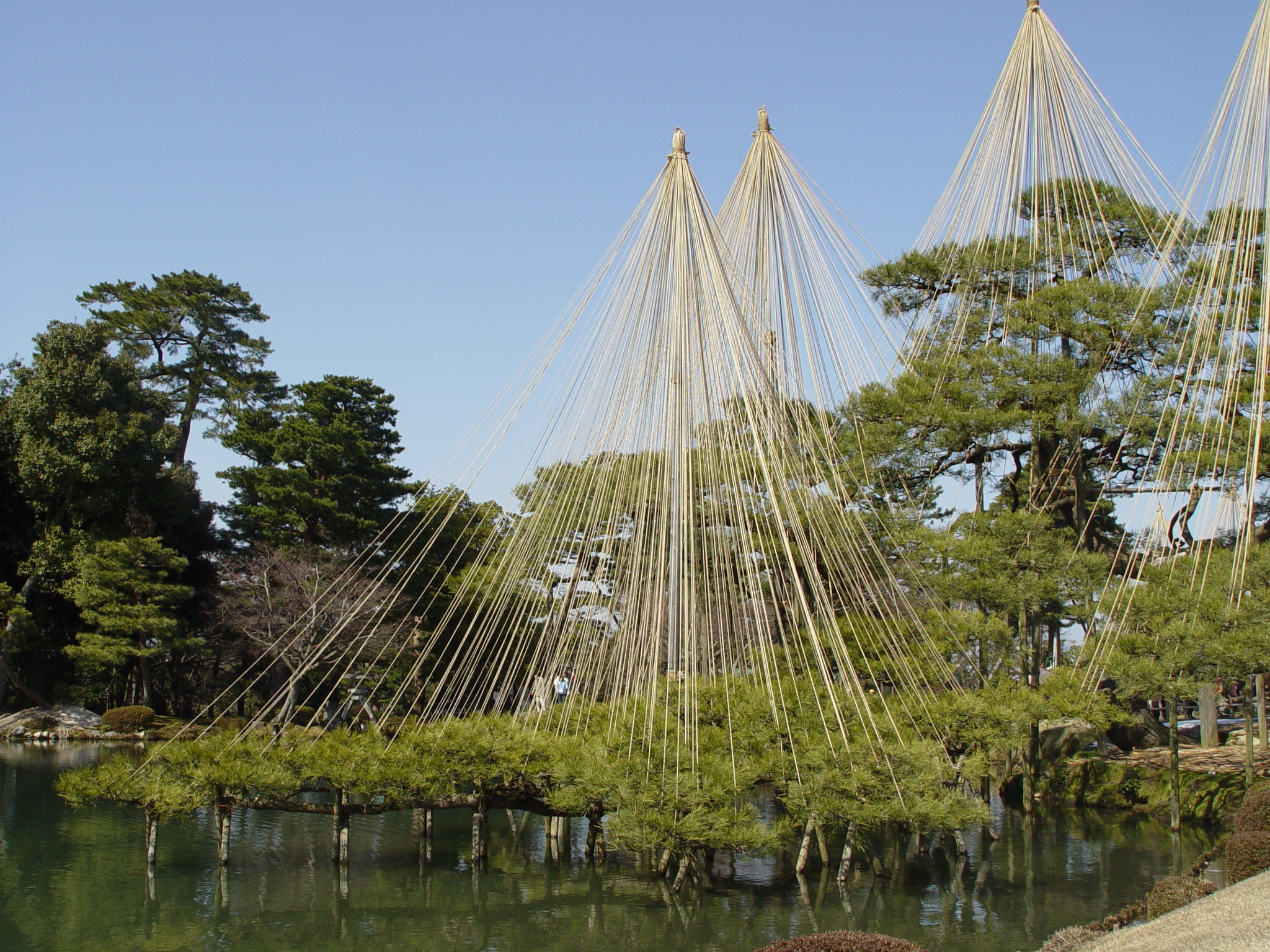
Some ancient pine trees at Kenroku-en supported by cords in winter to keep their limbs from breaking

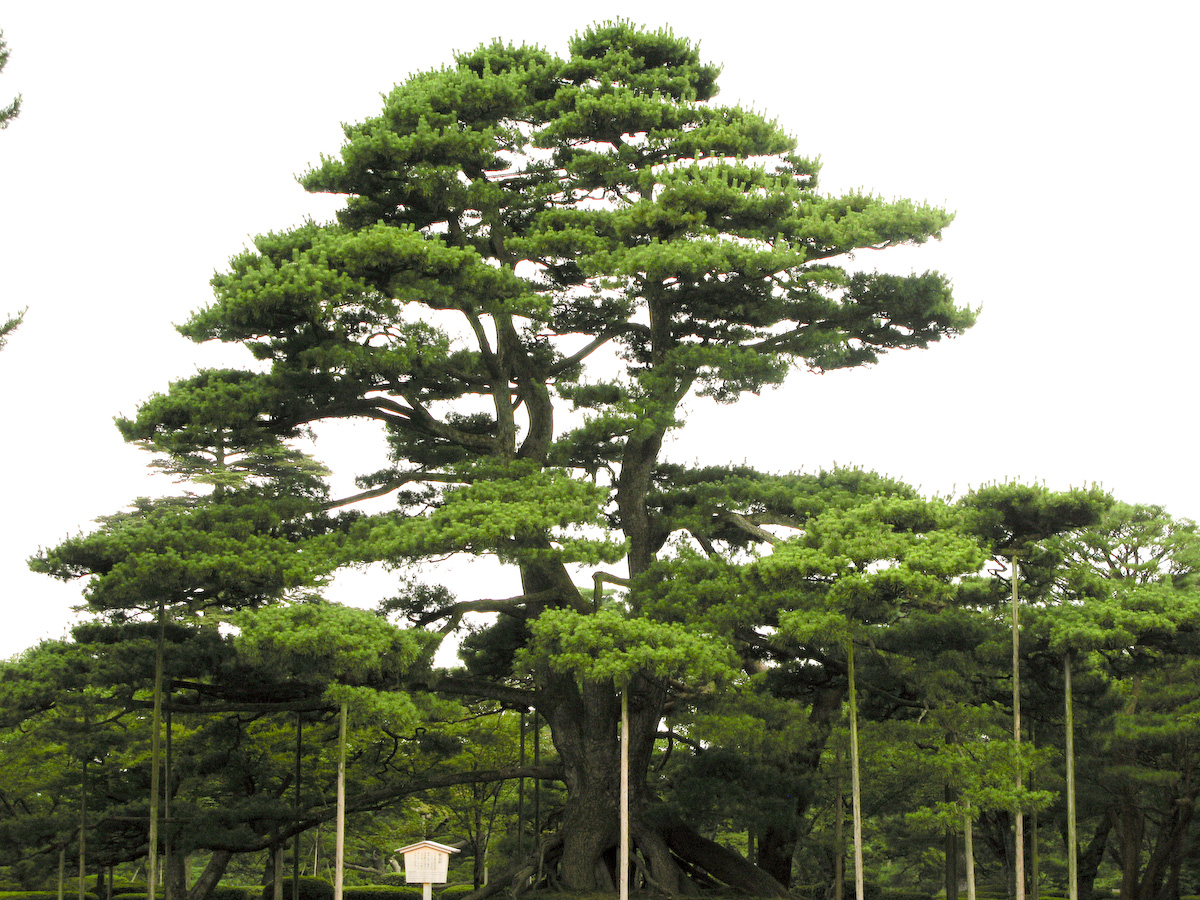
Pine trees at Kenroku-en garden supported by braces to support the weight of snow without breaking

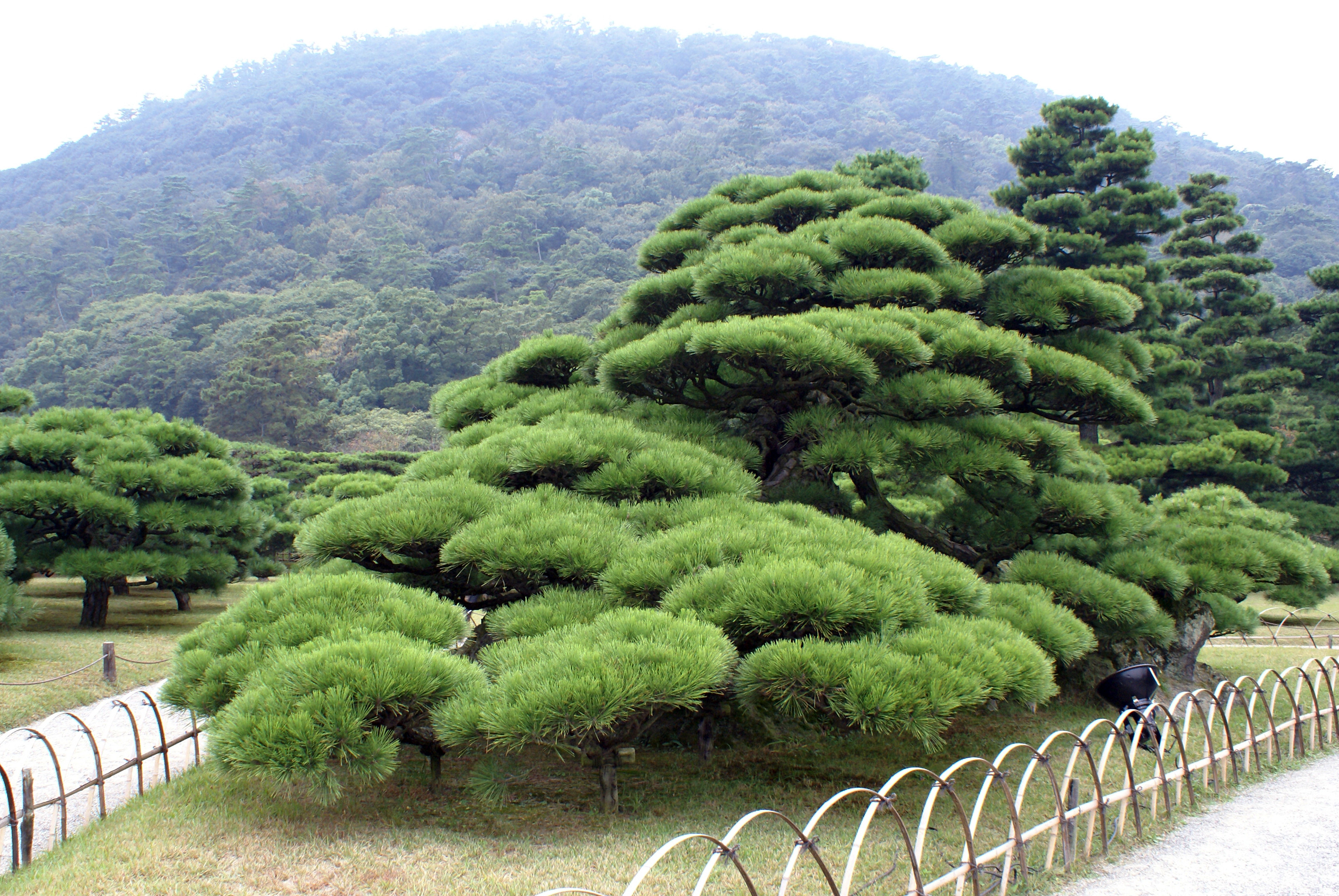
Landscape in Ritsurin Garden

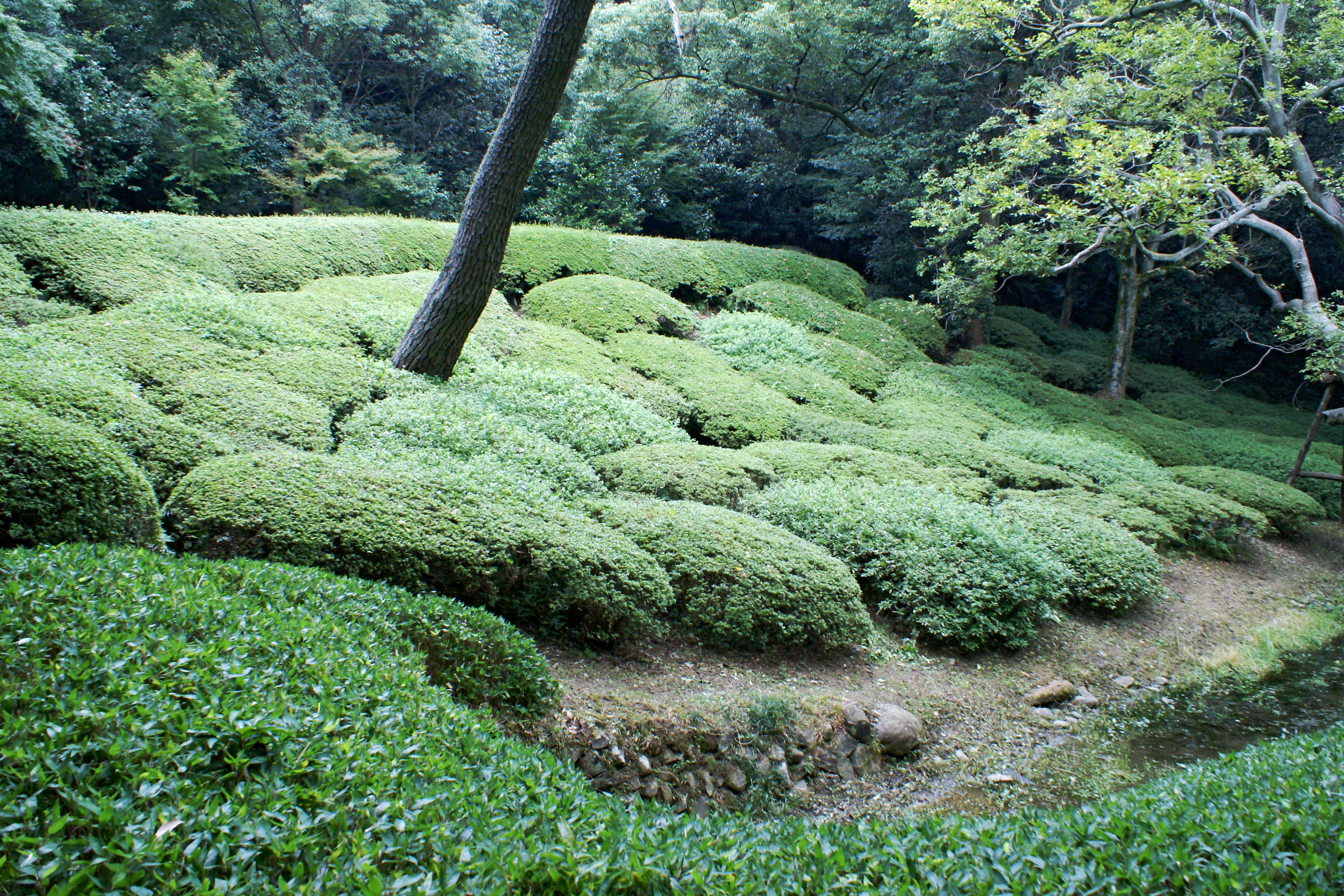
Ōkarikomi; trimmed bushes in Ritsurin Garden

=== Fish ===
The use of fish, particularly koi (colored carp), Japanese rice fish or goldfish as a decorative element in gardens was borrowed from the Chinese garden. Goldfish were developed in China more than a thousand years ago by selectively breeding Prussian carp for color mutations. By the Song dynasty (960–1279), yellow, orange, white and red-and-white colorations had been developed. Goldfish were introduced to Japan in the 16th century. Koi were developed from common carp (Cyprinus carpio) in Japan in the 1820s. Koi are domesticated common carp that are selected or culled for color; they are not a different species, and will revert to the original coloration within a few generations if allowed to breed freely. In addition to fish, turtles are kept in some gardens. Natural environments in the gardens offer habitats that attract wild animals; frogs and birds are notable as they contribute with a pleasant soundscape.

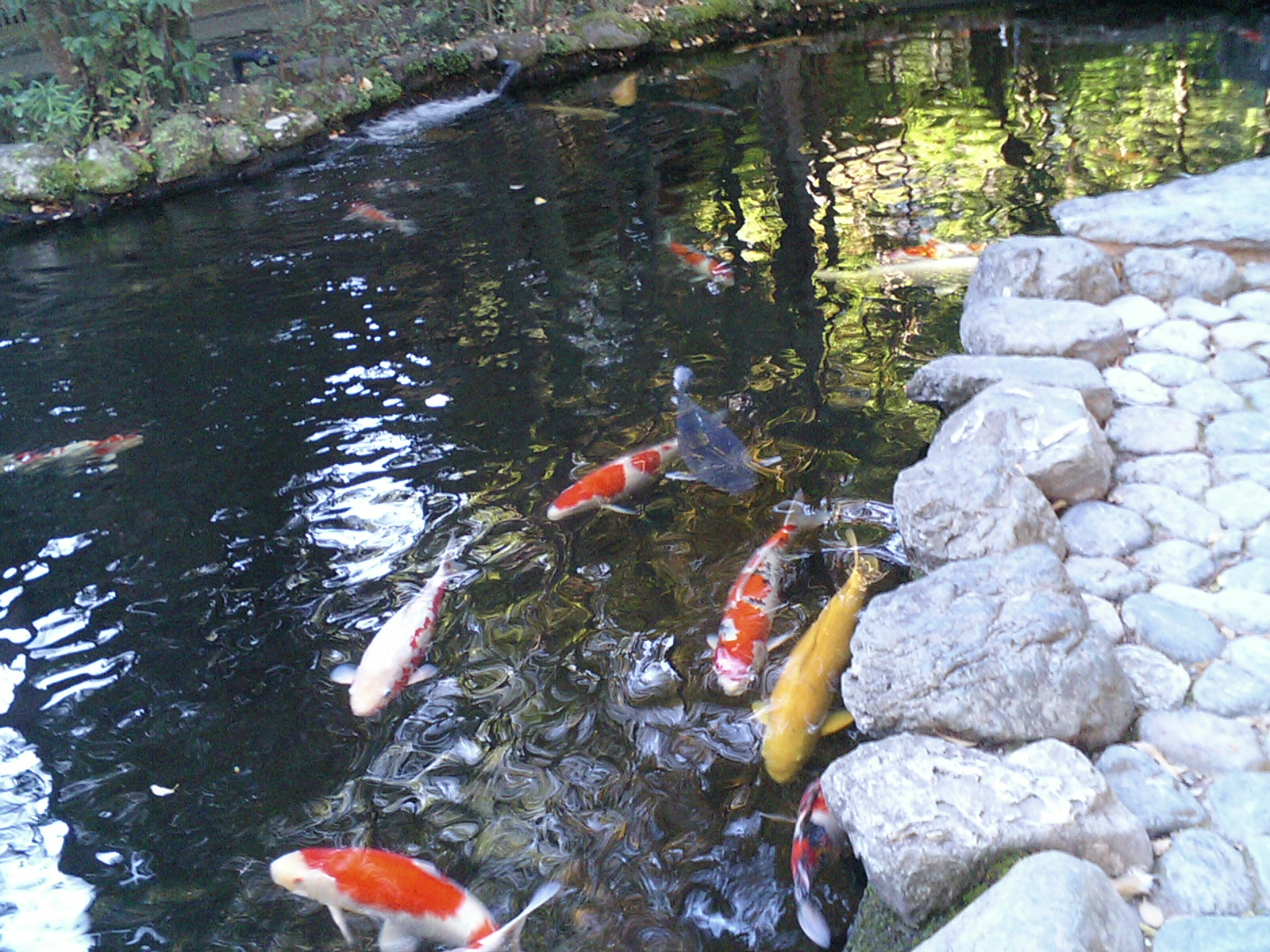
Koi in the Ise Grand Shrine 2005

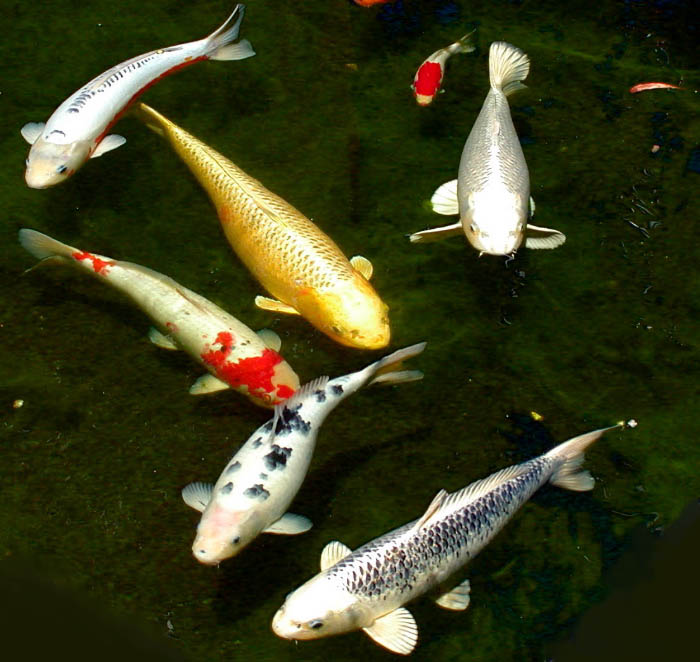
Koi

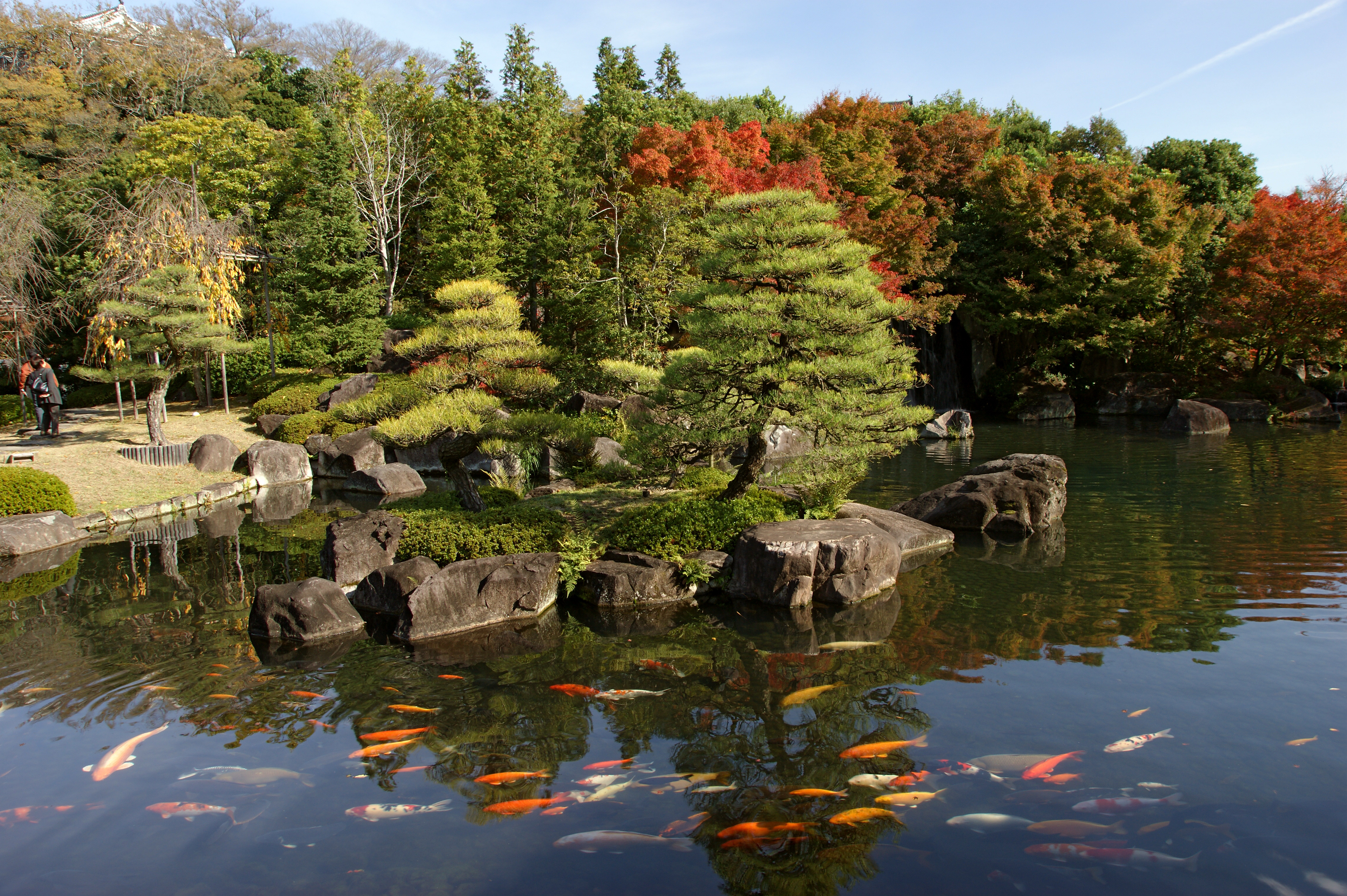
Koi in Himeji Koko-en Garden

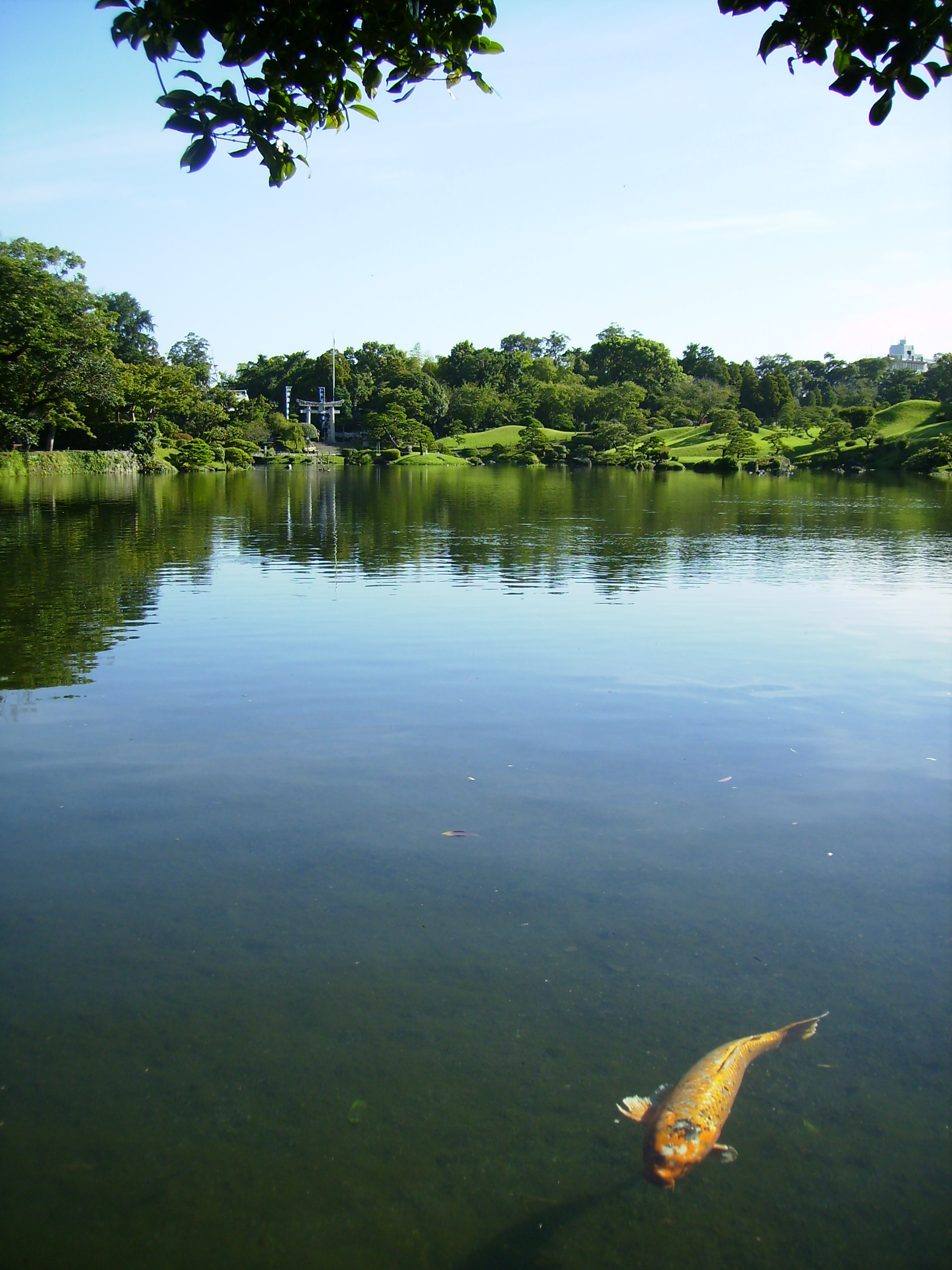
A large carp in the garden of Suizen-ji

== Aesthetic principles ==
The early Japanese gardens largely followed the Chinese model, but gradually Japanese gardens developed their own principles and aesthetics. These were spelled out by a series of landscape gardening manuals, beginning with Sakuteiki ("Records of Garden Making") in the Heian period (794–1185). The principles of sacred gardens, such as the gardens of Zen Buddhist temples, were different from those of pleasure or promenade gardens; for example, Zen Buddhist gardens were designed to be seen, while seated, from a platform with a view of the whole garden, without entering it, while promenade gardens were meant to be seen by walking through the garden and stopping at a series of view points. However, they often contain common elements and used the same techniques.

- Miniaturisation: The Japanese garden is a miniature and idealized view of nature. Rocks can represent mountains, and ponds can represent seas. The garden is sometimes made to appear larger by forced perspective: placing larger rocks and trees in the foreground, and smaller ones in the background.
- Concealment miegakure ("hide and reveal"): The Zen Buddhist garden is meant to be seen all at once, but the promenade garden is meant to be seen one landscape at a time, like a scroll of painted landscapes unrolling. Features are hidden behind hills, trees groves or bamboo, walls or structures, to be discovered when the visitor follows the winding path.
- Borrowed scenery (shakkei): Smaller gardens are often designed to incorporate borrowed scenery, the view of features outside the garden such as hills, trees or temples, as part of the view. This makes the garden seem larger than it really is.
- Asymmetry: Japanese gardens are not laid on straight axes, or with a single feature dominating the view. Buildings and garden features are usually placed to be seen from a diagonal, and are carefully composed into scenes that contrast right angles, such as buildings with natural features, and vertical features, such as rocks, bamboo or trees, with horizontal features, such as water.

According to garden historians David and Michigo Young, at the heart of the Japanese garden is the principle that a garden is a work of art. "Though inspired by nature, it is an interpretation rather than a copy; it should appear to be natural, but it is not wild."

Landscape gardener Seyemon Kusumoto wrote that the Japanese generate "the best of nature's handiwork in a limited space".

There has been mathematical analysis of some traditional Japanese garden designs. These designs avoid contrasts, symmetries and groupings that would create points which dominate visual attention. Instead, they create scenes in which visual salience is evenly distributed across the field of view. Stand-out colours, textures, objects, and groups are avoided. The size of objects, groupings, and the spacings between them are arranged to be self-similar at multiple spatial scales; that is, they produce similar patterns when scaled up or down (zoomed in or out). This property is also seen in fractals and many natural scenes. This fractal-like self-similarity may be extended all the way down to the scale of surface textures (such as those of rocks and moss lawns). These textures are considered to express a wabi-sabi aesthetic.

== Differences between Japanese and Chinese gardens ==
Japanese gardens during the Heian period were modeled upon Chinese gardens, but by the Edo period there were distinct differences.

- Architecture: Chinese gardens have buildings in the center of the garden, occupying a large part of the garden space. The buildings are placed next to or over the central body of water. The garden buildings are very elaborate, with much architectural decoration. In later Japanese gardens, the buildings are well apart from the body of water, and the buildings are simple, with very little ornament. The architecture in a Japanese garden is largely or partly concealed.
- Viewpoint: Chinese gardens are designed to be seen from the inside, from the buildings, galleries and pavilions in the center of the garden. Japanese gardens are designed to be seen from the outside, as in the Japanese rock garden or zen garden; or from a path winding through the garden.
- Use of rocks: in a Chinese garden, particularly in the Ming dynasty, scholar's rocks were selected for their extraordinary shapes or resemblance to animals or mountains, and used for dramatic effect. They were often the stars and centerpieces of the garden. In later Japanese gardens, rocks were smaller and placed in more natural arrangements, integrated into the garden.
- Marine landscapes: Chinese gardens were inspired by Chinese inland landscapes, particularly Chinese lakes and mountains, while Japanese gardens often use miniaturized scenery from the Japanese coast. Japanese gardens frequently include white sand or pebble beaches and rocks which seem to have been worn by the waves and tide, which rarely appear in Chinese gardens.

== Garden styles ==
=== Chisen-shoyū-teien or pond garden ===
The chisen-shoyū-teien ("lake-spring-boat excursion garden") was imported from China during the Heian period (794–1185). It is also called the shinden-zukuri style, after the architectural style of the main building. It featured a large, ornate residence with two long wings reaching south to a large lake and garden. Each wing ended in a pavilion from which guests could enjoy the views of the lake. Visitors made tours of the lake in small boats. These gardens had large lakes with small islands, where musicians played during festivals and ceremonies worshippers could look across the water at the Buddha. No original gardens of this period remain, but reconstructions can be seen at Heian-jingū and Daikaku-ji temple in Kyoto.

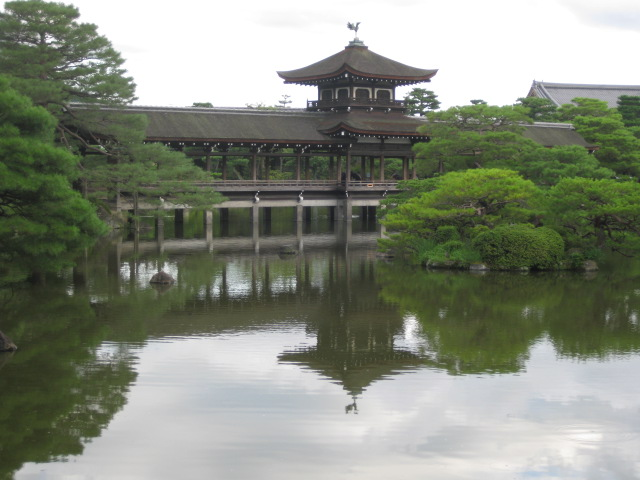
Heian-jingū is a recreation of the old imperial pond garden of Kyoto.

=== The Paradise Garden ===
The Paradise Garden appeared in the late Heian period, created by nobles belonging to the Amida Buddhism sect. They were meant to symbolize Paradise or the Pure Land (Jōdo), where the Buddha sat on a platform contemplating a lotus pond. These gardens featured a lake island called Nakajima, where the Buddha hall was located, connected to the shore by an arching bridge. The most famous surviving example is the garden of the Phoenix Hall of Byōdō-in Temple, built in 1053, in Uji, near Kyoto. Other examples are Jōruri-ji temple in Kyoto, Enro-ji temple in Nara Prefecture, the Hokongoin in Kyoto, Mōtsū-ji Temple in Hiraizumi, and Shiramizu Amidado Garden in Iwaki City.

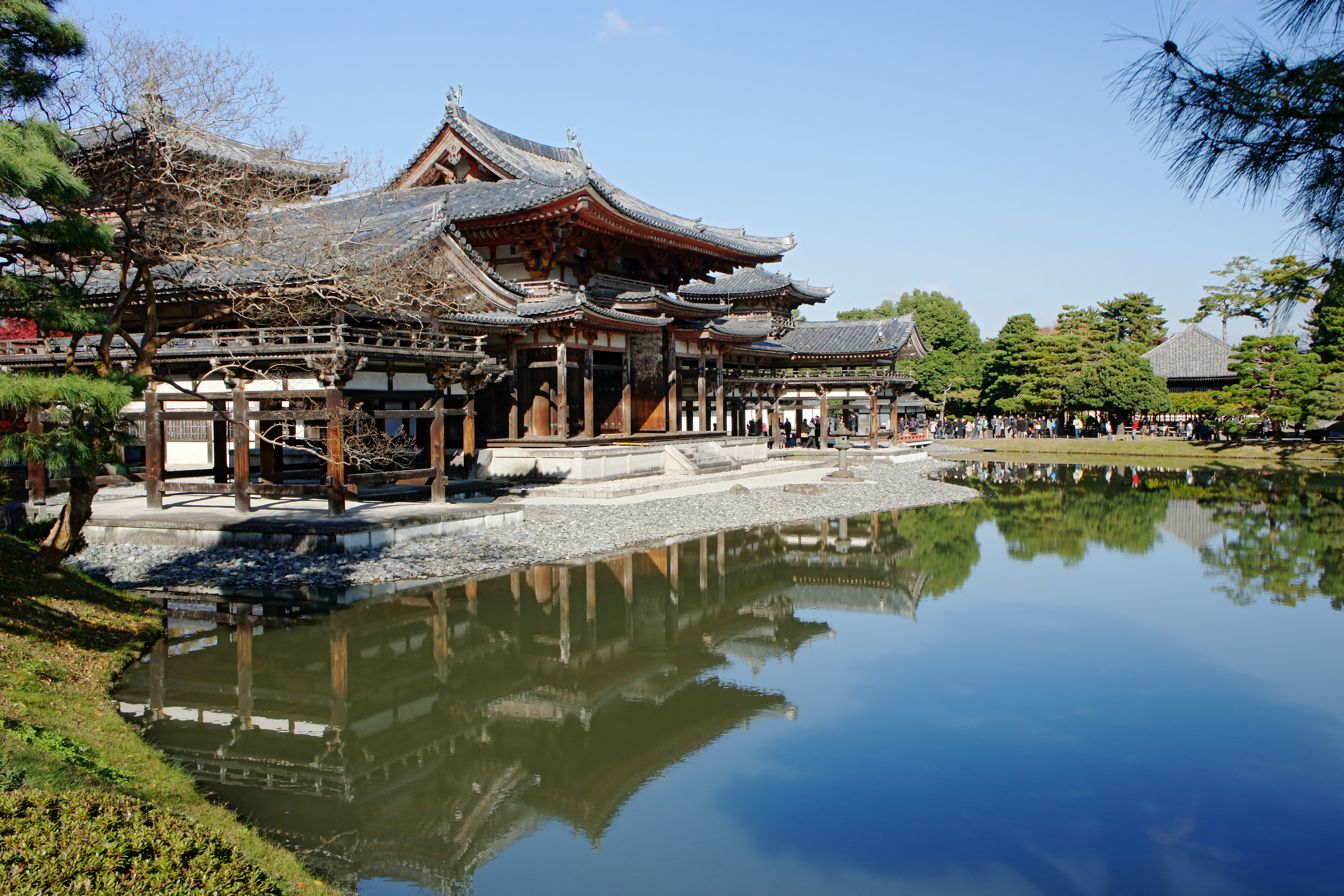
Byōdō-in Temple in Uji, near Kyoto

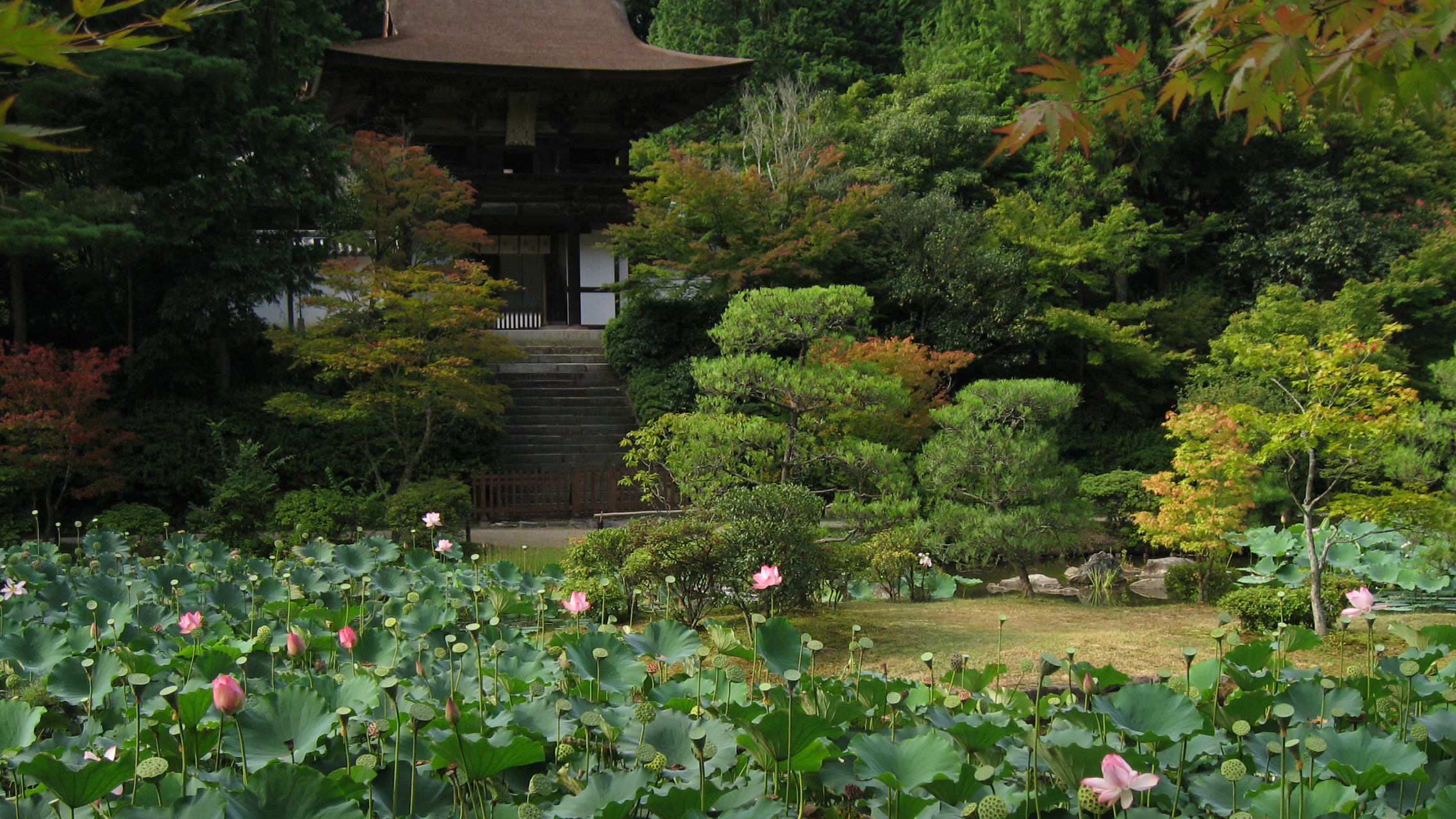
Enjō-ji Temple in Nara Prefecture is a good example of a paradise garden of the late Heian period.

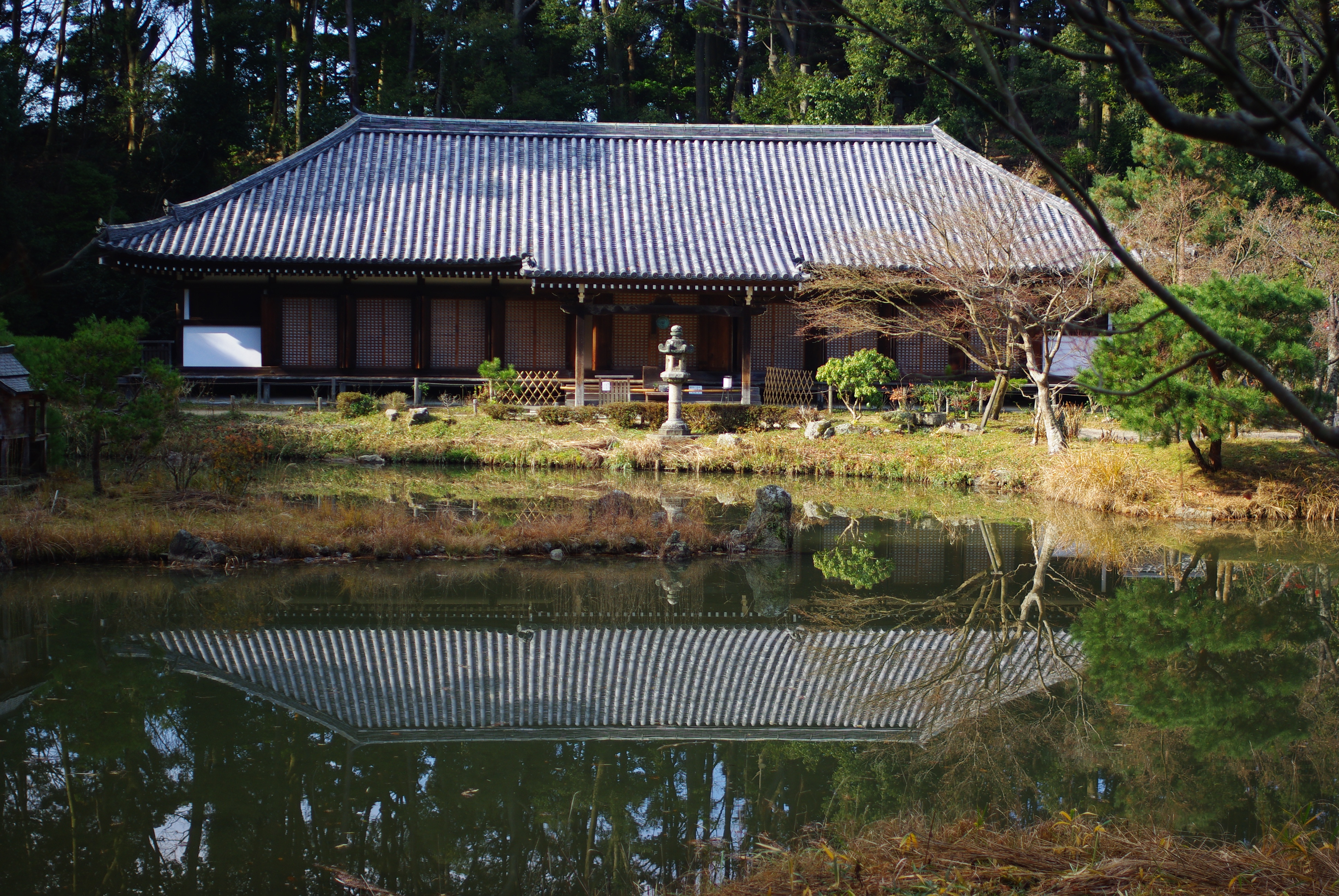
Jōruri-ji, a paradise garden in Kyoto. The pond was dug by monks in 1150.

=== Karesansui dry rock gardens ===
Karesansui gardens (枯山水) or Japanese rock gardens, became popular in Japan in the 14th century thanks to the work of a Buddhist monk, Musō Soseki (1275–1351) who built zen gardens at the five major monasteries in Kyoto. These gardens have white sand or raked gravel in place of water, carefully arranged rocks, and sometimes rocks and sand covered with moss. Their purpose is to facilitate meditation, and they are meant to be viewed while seated on the porch of the residence of the hōjō, the abbot of the monastery. The most famous example is Ryōan-ji temple in Kyoto.

Rosan-ji garden, Kyoto

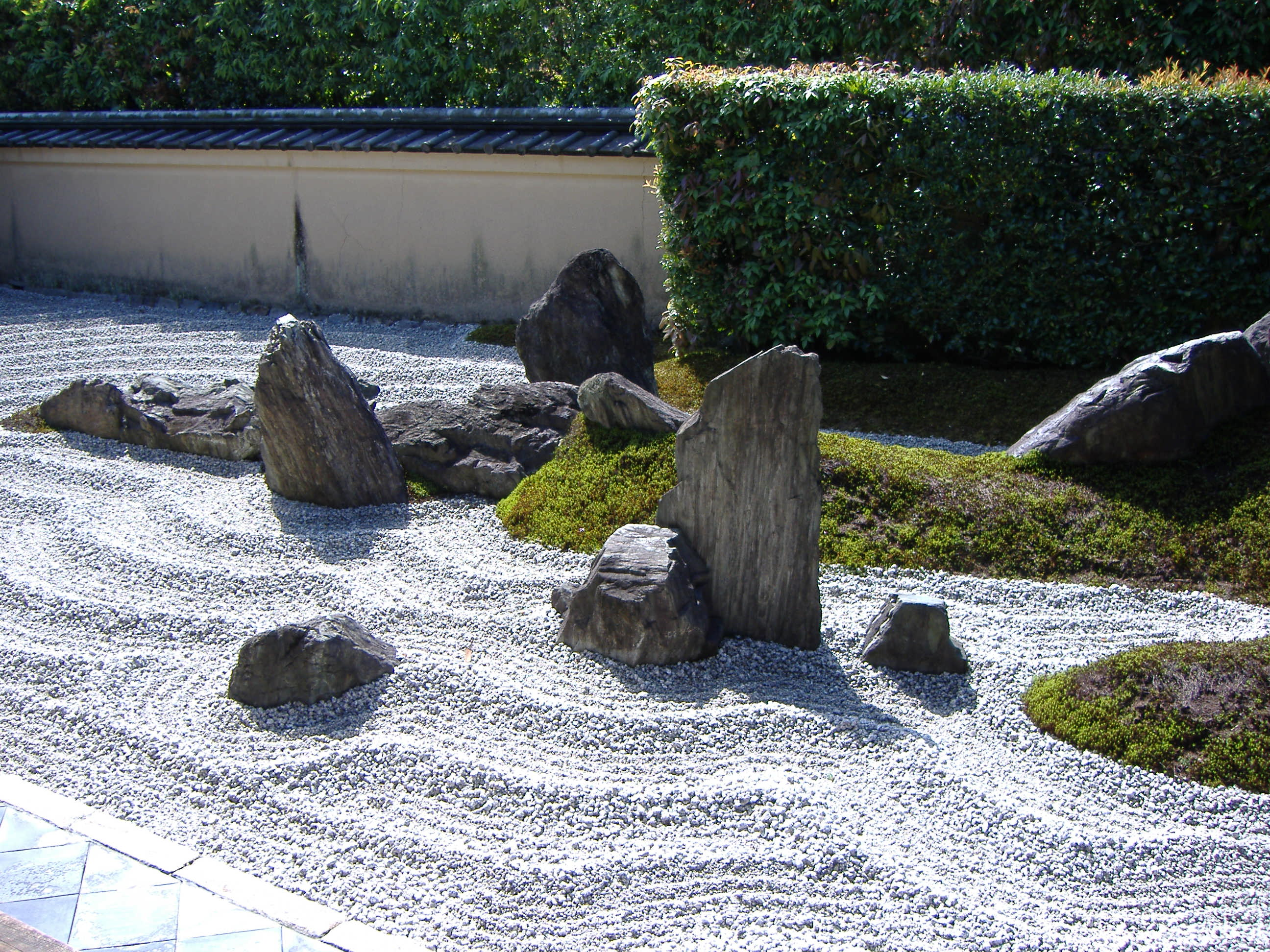
Zuihō-in garden, Kyoto

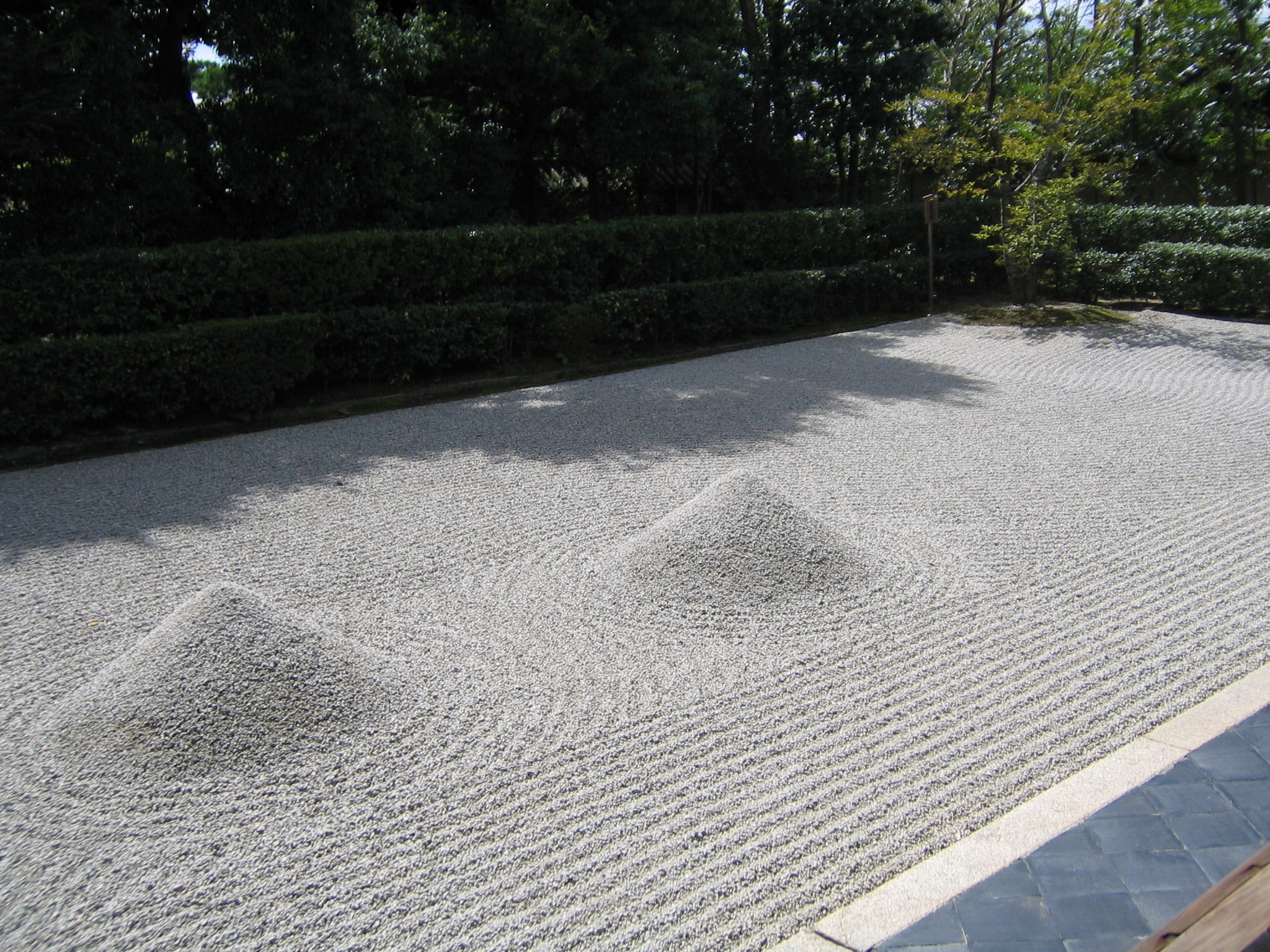
Daisen-in, Kyoto

=== Roji, or tea gardens ===
The tea garden was created during the Muromachi period (1333–1573) and Momoyama period (1573–1600) as a setting for the Japanese tea ceremony, or chanoyu. The style of garden takes its name from the roji, or path to the teahouse, which is supposed to inspire the visitor to meditation to prepare him for the ceremony. There is an outer garden, with a gate and covered arbor where guests wait for the invitation to enter. They then pass through a gate to the inner garden, where they wash their hands and rinse their mouth, as they would before entering a Shinto shrine, before going into the teahouse itself. The path is always kept moist and green, so it will look like a remote mountain path, and there are no bright flowers that might distract the visitor from his meditation. Early teahouses had no windows, but later teahouses have a wall which can be opened for a view of the garden.

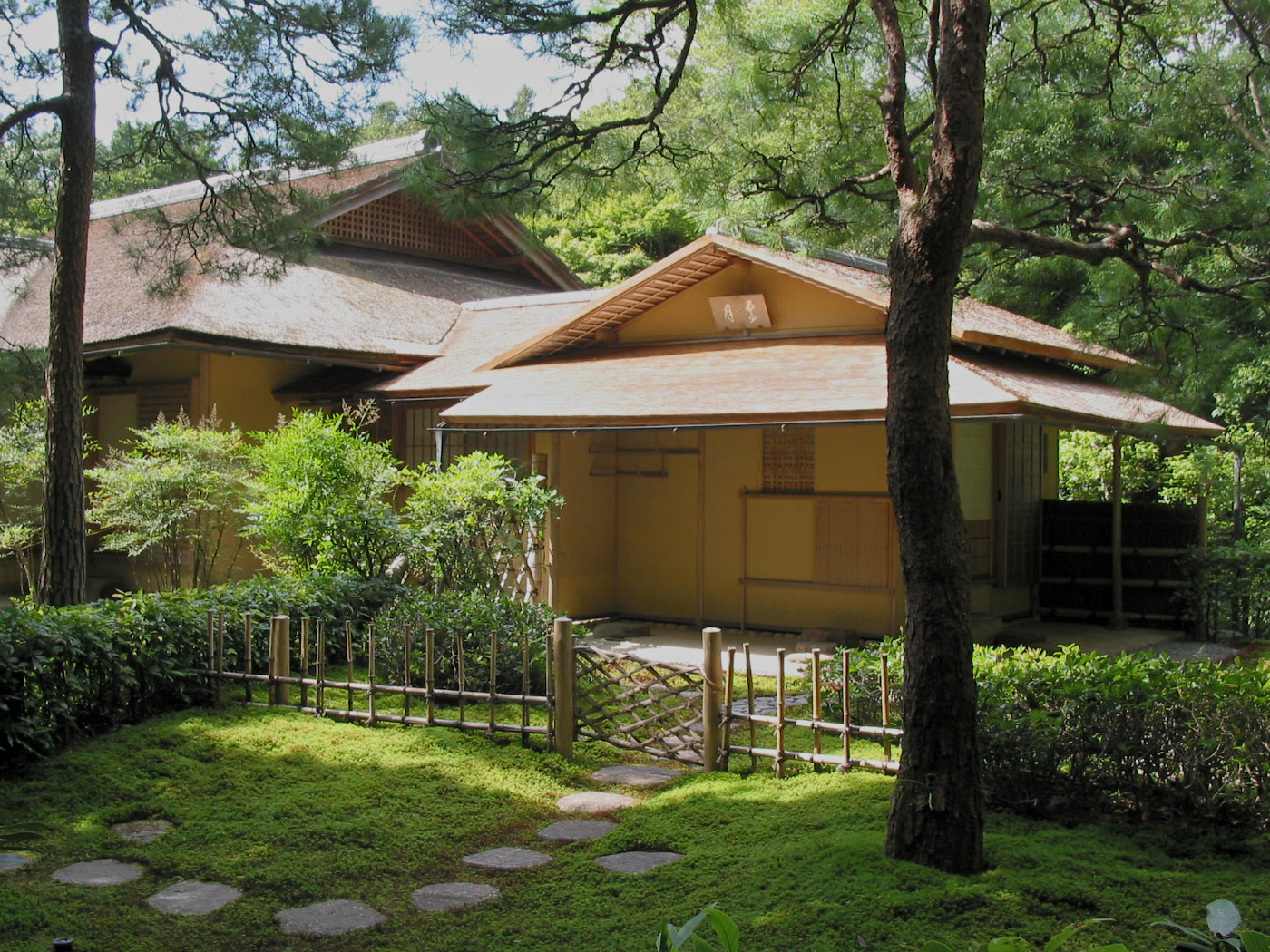
A teahouse and roji, or tea garden, at Ise Jingu

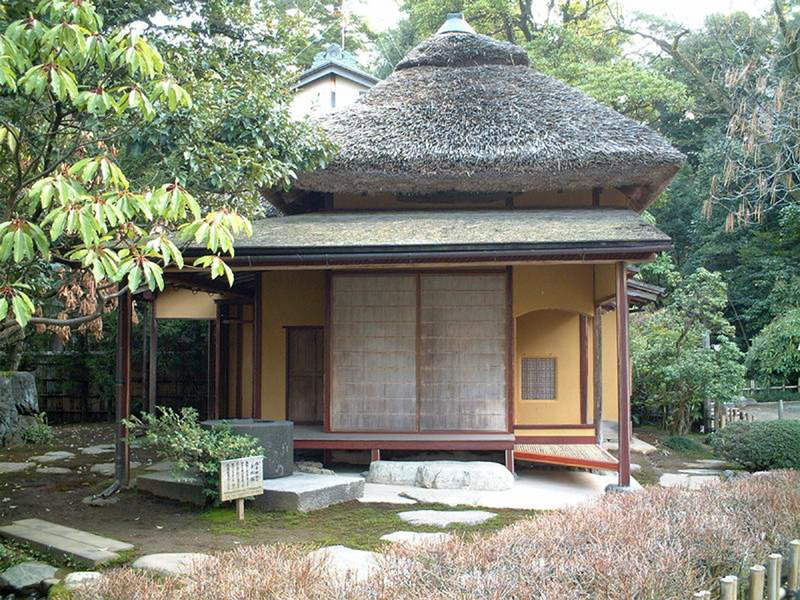
Traditional teahouse and tea garden at Kenroku-en Garden

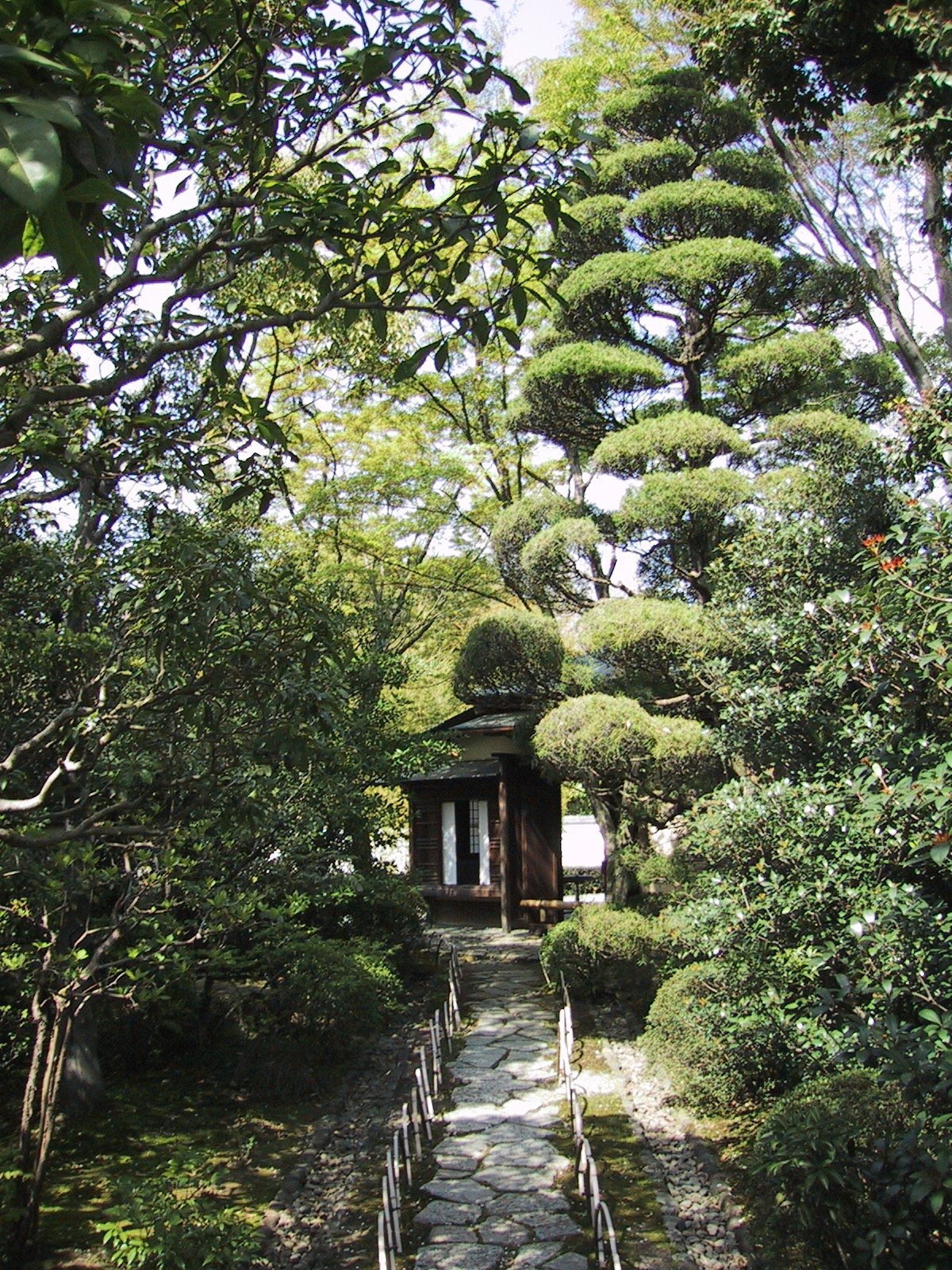
Garden of the Urakuen teahouse

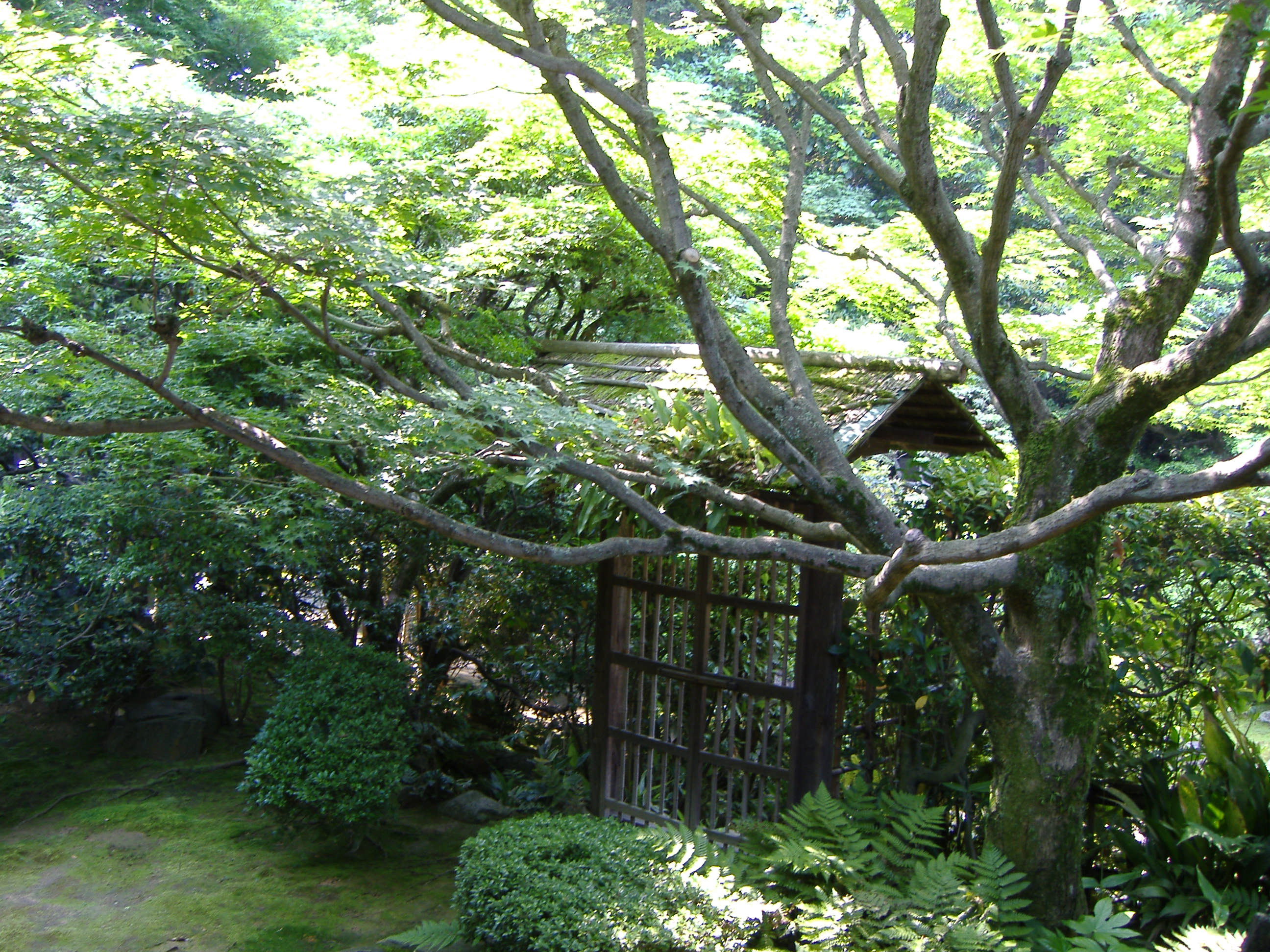
Rustic gate of the Keishun-in garden teahouse in Kyoto

=== Kaiyū-shiki-teien, or promenade gardens ===
Promenade or stroll gardens (landscape gardens in the go-round style) first appeared in Japan during the Edo period (1600–1854), at the villas of nobles or warlords. These gardens were designed to complement the houses in the new sukiya-zukuri style of architecture, which were modeled after the teahouse.

Promenade gardens were meant to be seen by following a path clockwise around a lake from one carefully composed scene to another. These gardens made use of two techniques to provide interest: borrowed scenery (借景, shakkei), which took advantage of views of scenery outside the garden, such as mountains or temples, incorporating them into the view so the garden looked larger than it really was; and miegakure (見え隠れ), or "hide-and-reveal", which used winding paths, fences, bamboo and buildings to hide the scenery so the visitor would not see it until he was at the best view point.

Edo period gardens also often feature recreations of famous scenery or scenes inspired by literature. For example, Suizen-ji Jōju-en Garden in Kumamoto has a miniature version of Mount Fuji, and Katsura Villa in Kyoto has a miniature version of the Ama-no-hashidate sandbar in Miyazu Bay, near Kyoto. The Rikugi-en Garden in Tokyo creates small landscapes inspired by eighty-eight famous Japanese poems.

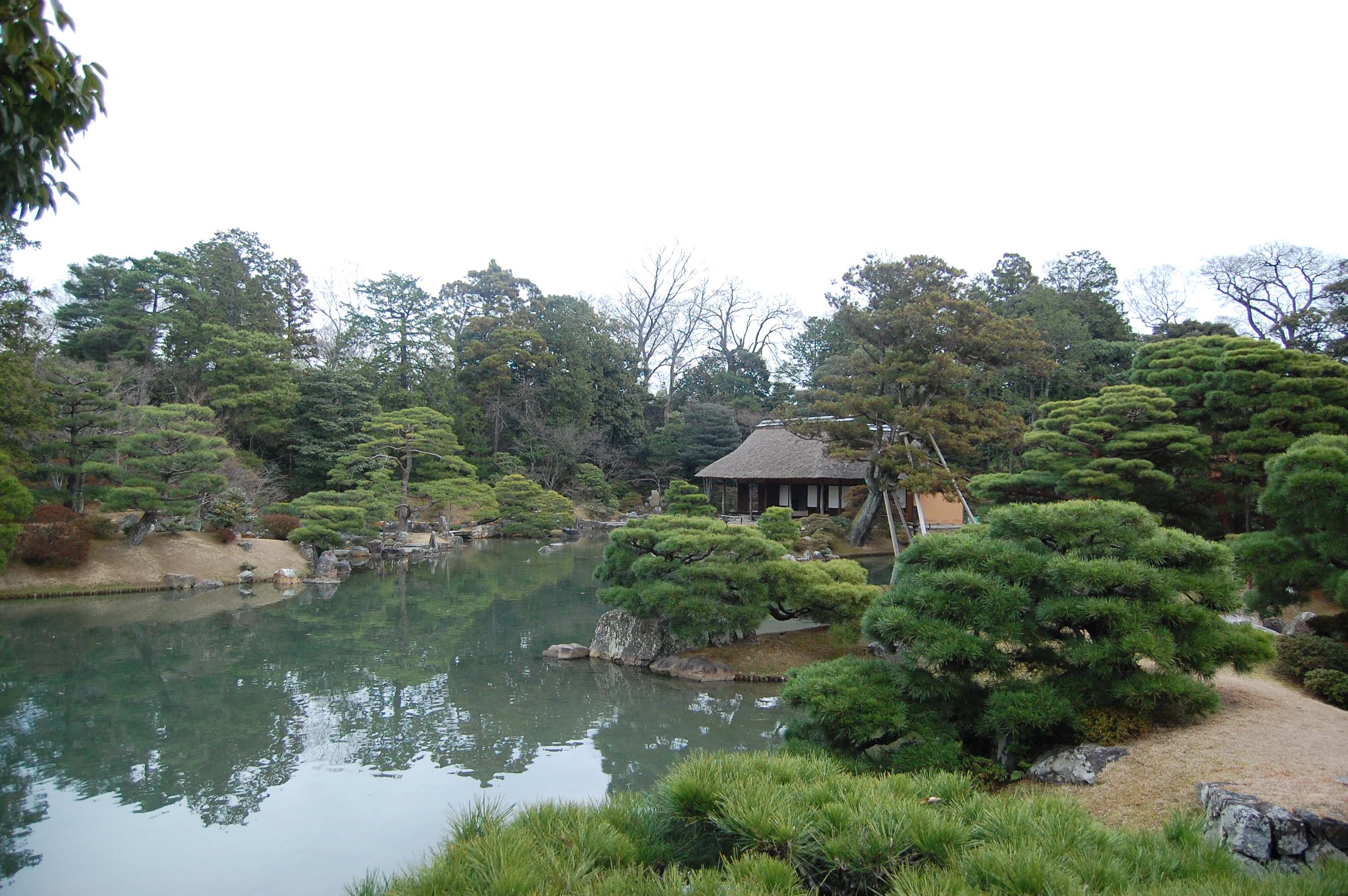
Katsura Imperial Villa, the prototype for the promenade garden

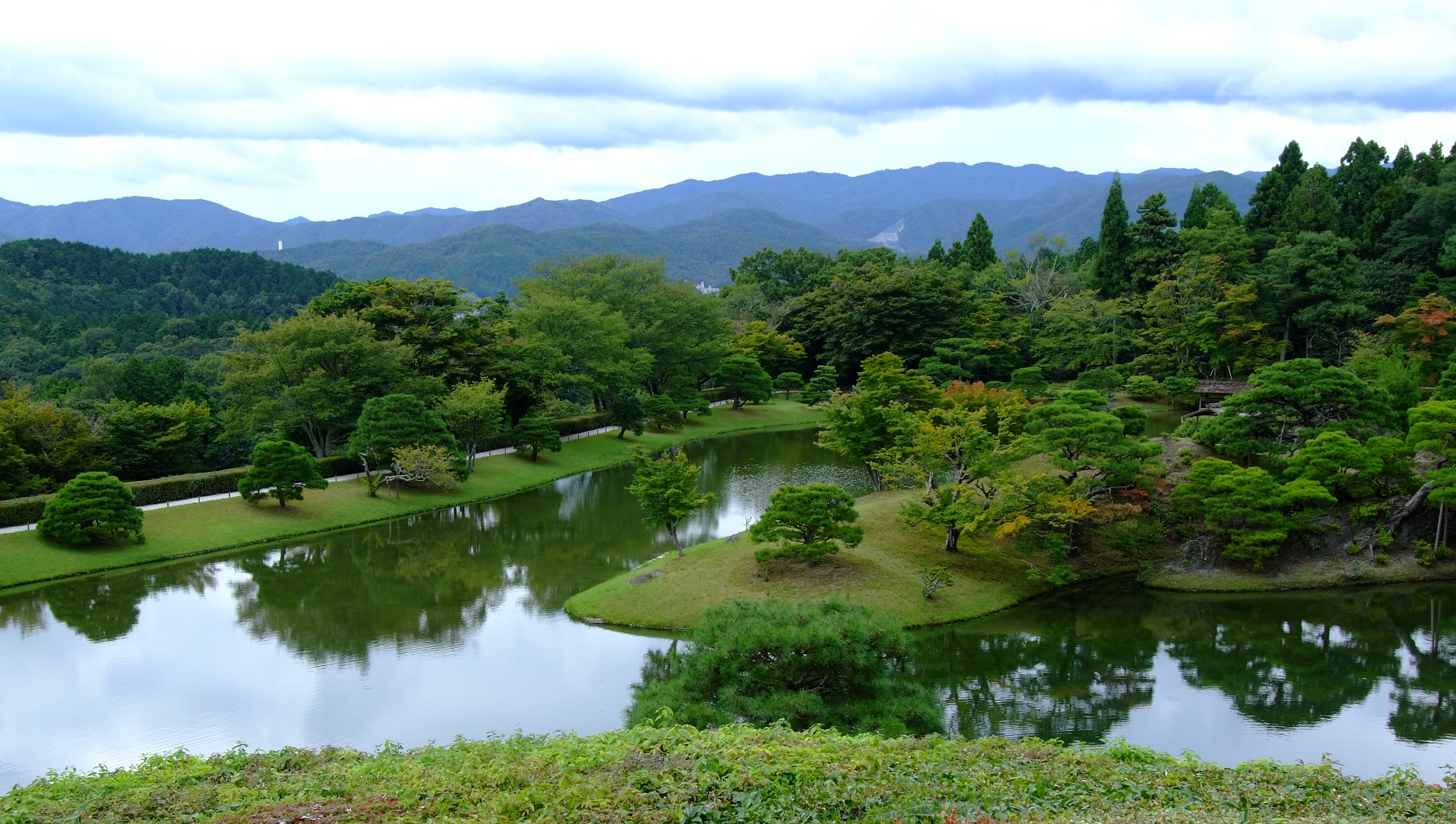
Shugaku-in Imperial Villa, completed in 1659, another classic example of a promenade garden of the Edo period

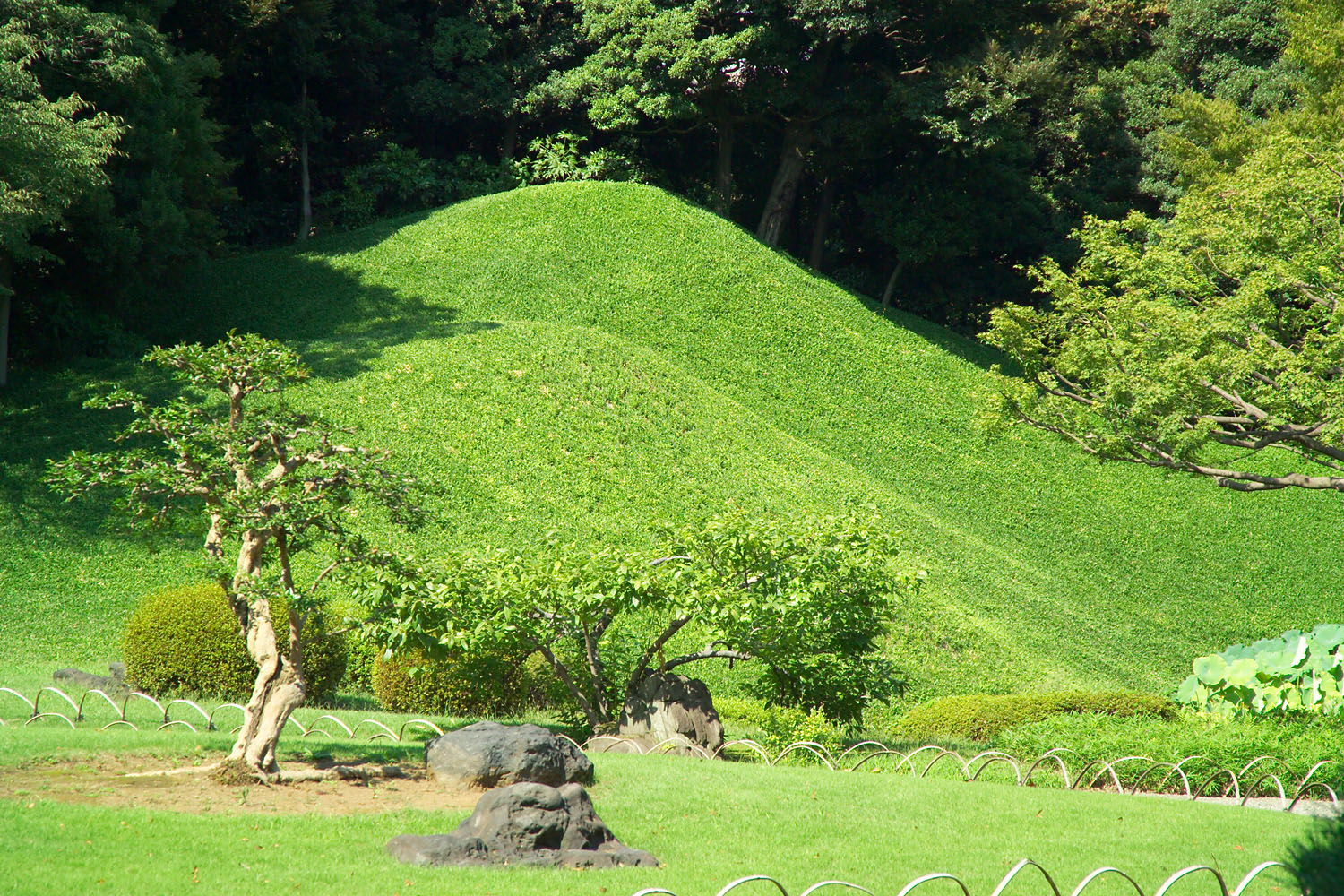
Two hills covered with trimmed bamboo grass which represent Mount Lu in China. This feature is in Koishikawa Kōrakuen Garden in Tokyo.

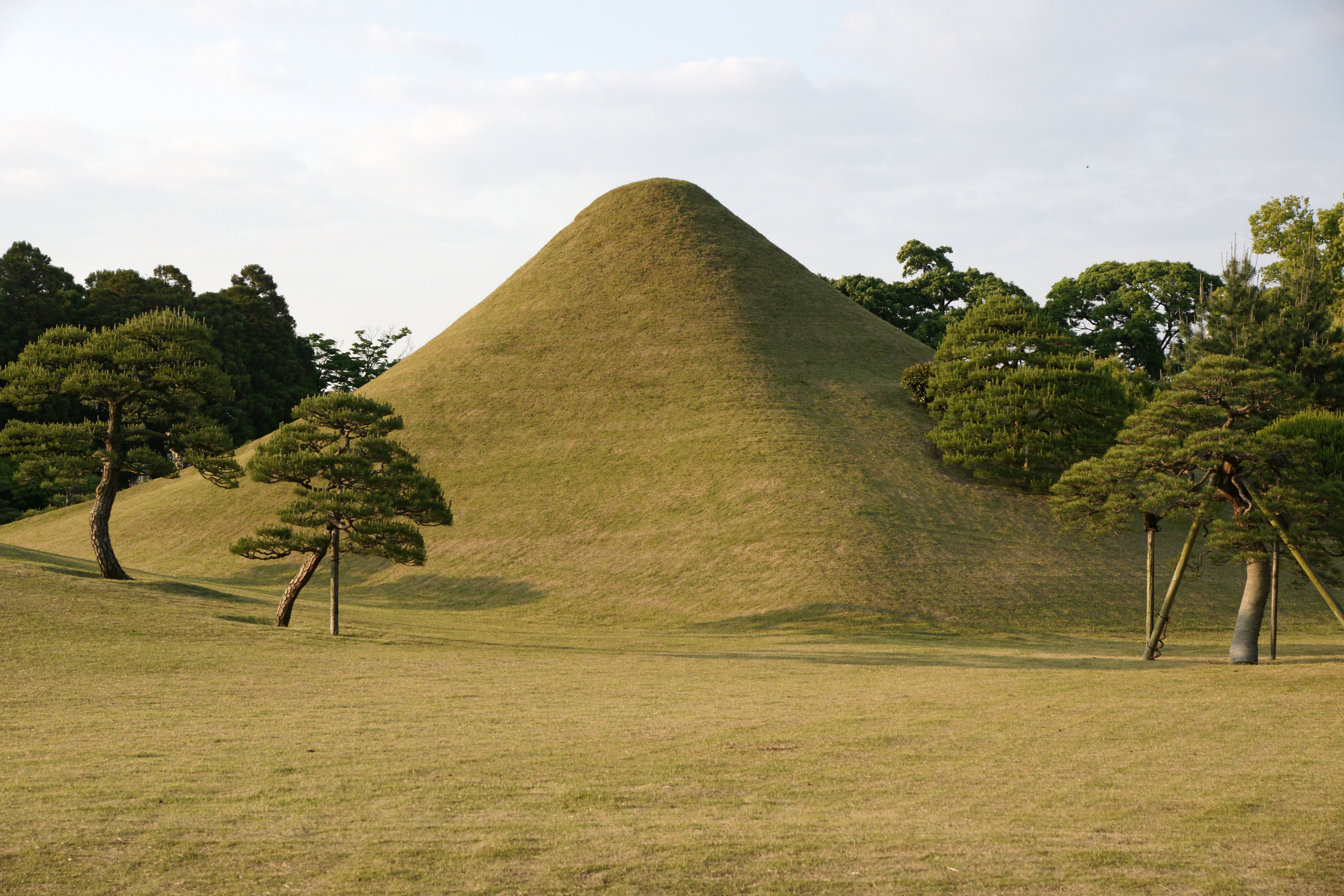
Suizen-ji Jōju-en Garden, begun in 1636, has a miniature replica of Mount Fuji. The trees on the upper part of the hill are trimmed to be smaller, to make the mountain look taller.

=== Small urban gardens ===
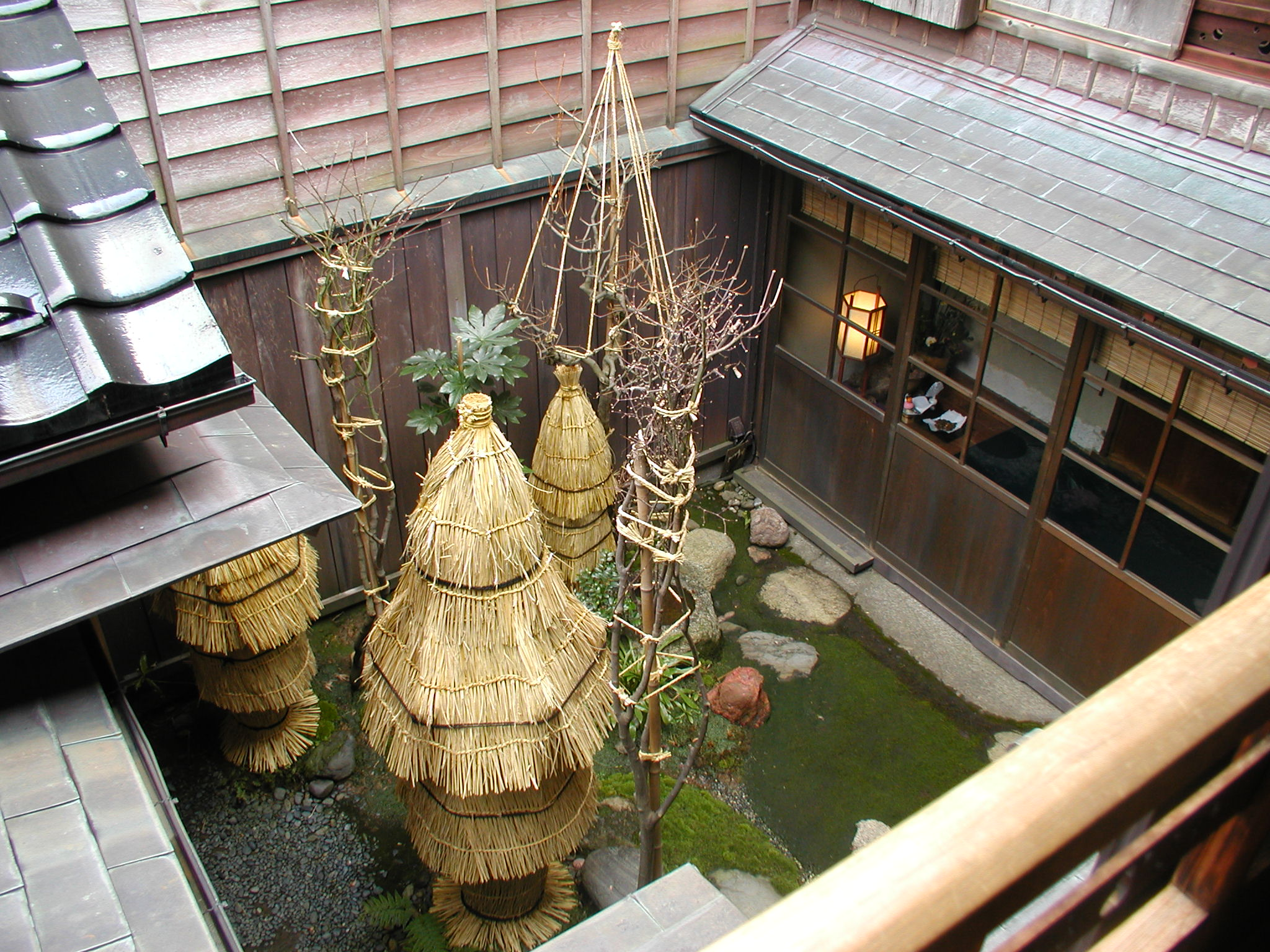
The naka-niwa or courtyard garden of a former geisha house in Kanazawa, Ishikawa. The trees are covered with straw to protect them from the snow.

Small gardens were originally found in the interior courtyards (naka-niwa, "inner garden") of Heian period palaces, and were designed to give a glimpse of nature and some privacy to the residents of the rear side of the building. They were as small as one tsubo, or about 3.3 square meters, whence the name tsubo-niwa. During the Edo period, merchants began building small gardens in the space behind their shops, which faced the street, and their residences, located at the rear. These tiny gardens were meant to be seen, not entered, and usually had a stone lantern, a water basin, stepping stones and a few plants. Today, tsubo-niwa are found in many Japanese residences, hotels, restaurants, and public buildings. A good example from the Meiji period is found in the villa of Murin-an in Kyoto. Totekiko is a famous courtyard rock garden.

=== Hermitage garden ===
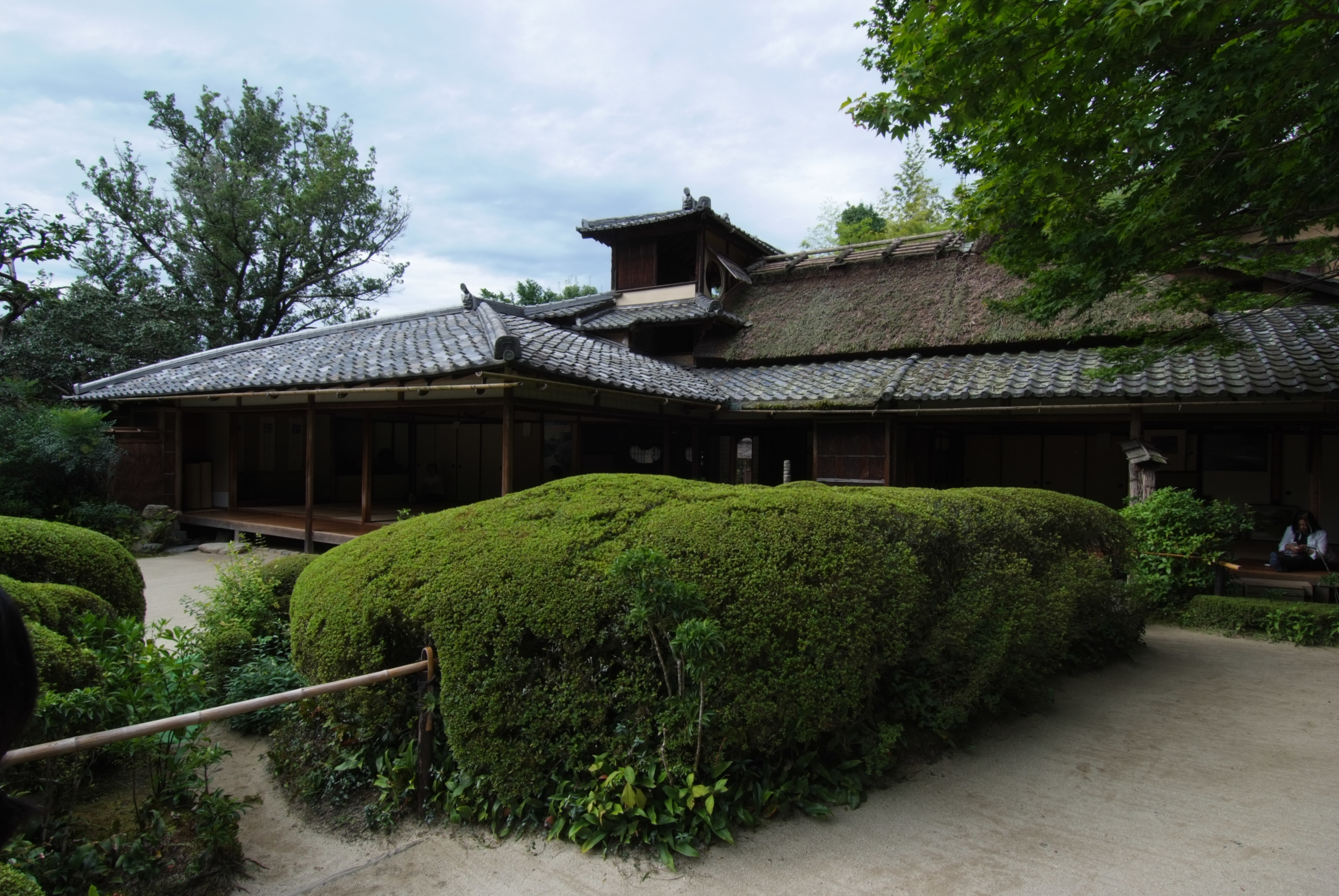
Shisen-dō, built in Kyoto, in the 17th century, one of the best examples of a hermitage garden

A hermitage garden is a small garden usually built by a samurai or government official who wanted to retire from public life and devote himself to study or meditation. It is attached to a rustic house, and approached by a winding path, which suggests it is deep in a forest. It may have a small pond, a Japanese rock garden, and the other features of traditional gardens, in miniature, designed to create tranquility and inspiration. An example is the Shisen-dō garden in Kyoto, built by a bureaucrat and scholar exiled by the shogun in the 17th century. It is now a Buddhist temple.

== Literature and art of the Japanese garden ==
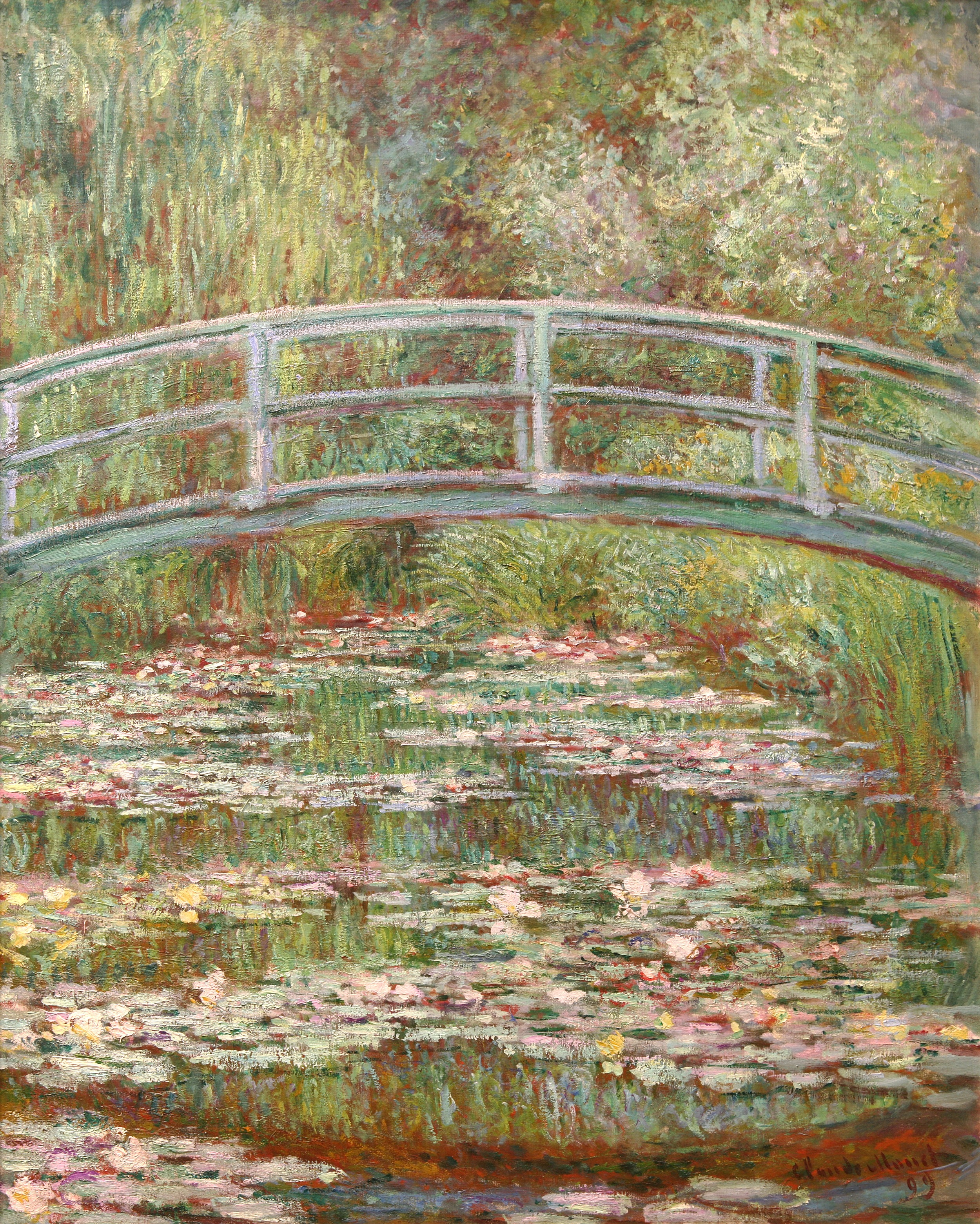
Claude Monet, Bridge over a Pond of Water Lilies, 1899, Metropolitan Museum of Art

=== Garden manuals ===
The first manual of Japanese gardening was the Sakuteiki ("Records of Garden Making"), probably written in the late eleventh century by Tachibana no Tohshitsuna (1028–1094). Citing even older Chinese sources, it explains how to organize the garden, from the placement of rocks and streams to the correct depth of ponds and height of cascades. While it was based on earlier Chinese garden principles, it also expressed ideas which were unique to Japanese gardens, such as islands, beaches and rock formations imitating Japanese maritime landscapes.

Besides giving advice, Sakuteiki also gives dire warnings of what happens if the rules are not followed; the author warns that if a rock that in nature was in a horizontal position is stood upright in a garden, it will bring misfortune to the owner of the garden. And, if a large rock pointed toward the north or west is placed near a gallery, the owner of the garden will be forced to leave before a year passes.

Another influential work about the Japanese garden, bonseki, bonsai and related arts was Rhymeprose on a Miniature Landscape Garden (around 1300) by the Zen monk Kokan Shiren, which explained how meditation on a miniature garden purified the senses and the mind and led to understanding of the correct relationship between man and nature.

Other influential garden manuals which helped to define the aesthetics of the Japanese garden are Senzui Narabi ni Yagyo no Zu (Illustrations for Designing Mountain, Water and Hillside Field Landscapes), written in the fifteenth century, and Tsukiyama Teizoden (Building Mountains and Making Gardens), from the 18th century. The tradition of Japanese gardening was historically passed down from sensei to apprentice. The opening words of Illustrations for designing mountain, water and hillside field landscapes (1466) are "If you have not received the oral transmissions, you must not make gardens" and its closing admonition is "You must never show this writing to outsiders. You must keep it secret".

These garden manuals are still studied today.

=== Gardens in literature and poetry ===
- The Tale of Genji, the classic Japanese novel of the Heian period, describes the role of the Japanese garden in court life. The characters attend festivals in the old Kyoto imperial palace garden, take boat trips on the lake, listen to music and watch formal dances under the trees.

Gardens were often the subject of poems during the Heian period. A poem in one anthology from the period, the Kokin-Shu, described the Kiku-shima, or island of chrystanthemums, found in the Osawa pond in the great garden of the period called Saga-in.

I had thought that here
only one chrysanthemum can grow.
Who therefore has planted
the other in the depths
of the pond of Osawa?

Another poem of the Heian period, in the Hyakunin isshu, described a cascade of rocks, which simulated a waterfall, in the same garden:

The cascade long ago
ceased to roar,
But we continue to hear
The murmur
of its name.

=== Philosophy, painting, and the Japanese garden ===
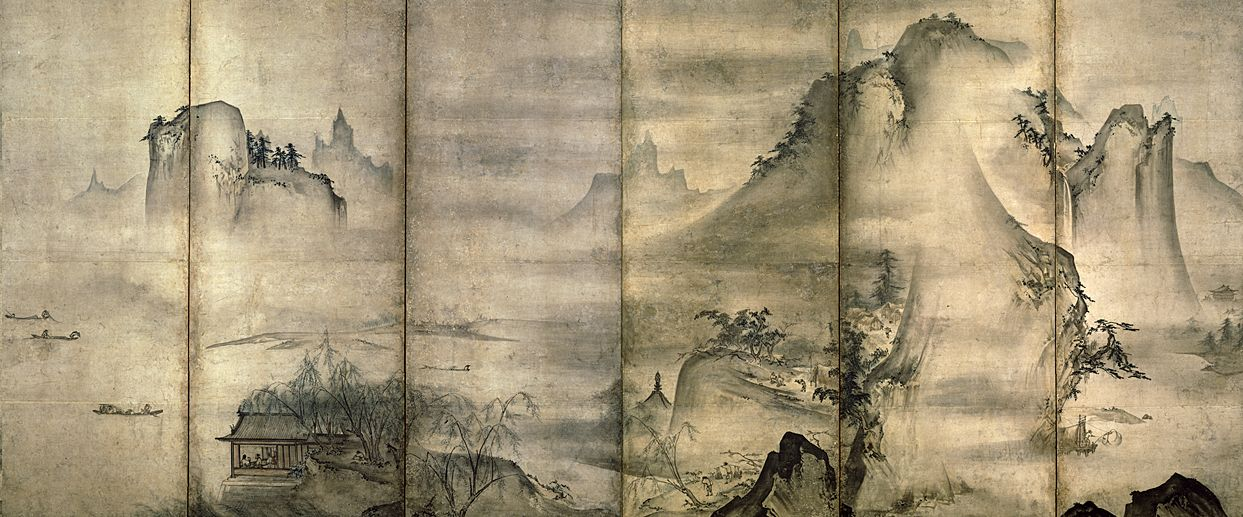
Painting of part of Landscape of the Four Seasons by the monk Tenshō Shūbun from the Muromachi period, showing an idealized Japanese landscape, where man was humble and lived in harmony with nature. This ideal landscape was also depicted in Japanese gardens.

In Japanese culture, garden-making is a high art, equal to the arts of calligraphy and ink painting. Gardens are considered three-dimensional textbooks of Daoism and Zen Buddhism. Sometimes the lesson is very literal; the garden of Saihō-ji featured a pond shaped like the Japanese character shin (心) or xīn in Chinese, the heart-spirit of Chinese philosophy, the newspaper character is 心 but it's the full cursive, the sousho style (草書) for shin that would be used; sousho, this well-named "grass writing", would be appropriate for gardening purpose indeed, for in cursive writing the character shapes change depending on the context and of course, since it is cursive, depending on the person -that is to say that the character would be done in a single pencil stroke, it would match the state of mind and the context rather than the newspaper print. However, usually the lessons are contained in the arrangements of the rocks, the water and the plants. For example, the lotus flower has a particular message; Its roots are in the mud at the bottom of the pond, symbolizing the misery of the human condition, but its flower is pure white, symbolizing the purity of spirit that can be achieved by following the teachings of the Buddha.

The Japanese rock gardens were intended to be intellectual puzzles for the monks who lived next to them to study and solve. They followed the same principles as the suiboku-ga, the black-and-white Japanese inks paintings of the same period, which, according to Zen Buddhist principles, tried to achieve the maximum effect using the minimum essential elements.

"Catching a catfish with a gourd" by Josetsu

One painter who influenced the Japanese garden was Josetsu (1405–1423), a Chinese Zen monk who moved to Japan and introduced a new style of ink-brush painting, moving away from the romantic misty landscapes of the earlier period, and using asymmetry and areas of white space, similar to the white space created by sand in zen gardens, to set apart and highlight a mountain or tree branch or other element of his painting. He became chief painter of the Shogun and influenced a generation of painters and garden designers.

Japanese gardens also follow the principles of perspective of Japanese landscape painting, which feature a close-up plane, an intermediate plane, and a distant plane. The empty space between the different planes has a great importance, and is filled with water, moss, or sand. The garden designers used various optical tricks to give the garden the illusion of being larger than it really is, by borrowing of scenery ("shakkei"), employing distant views outside the garden, or using miniature trees and bushes to create the illusion that they are far away.

== Noteworthy Japanese gardens ==
=== In Japan ===
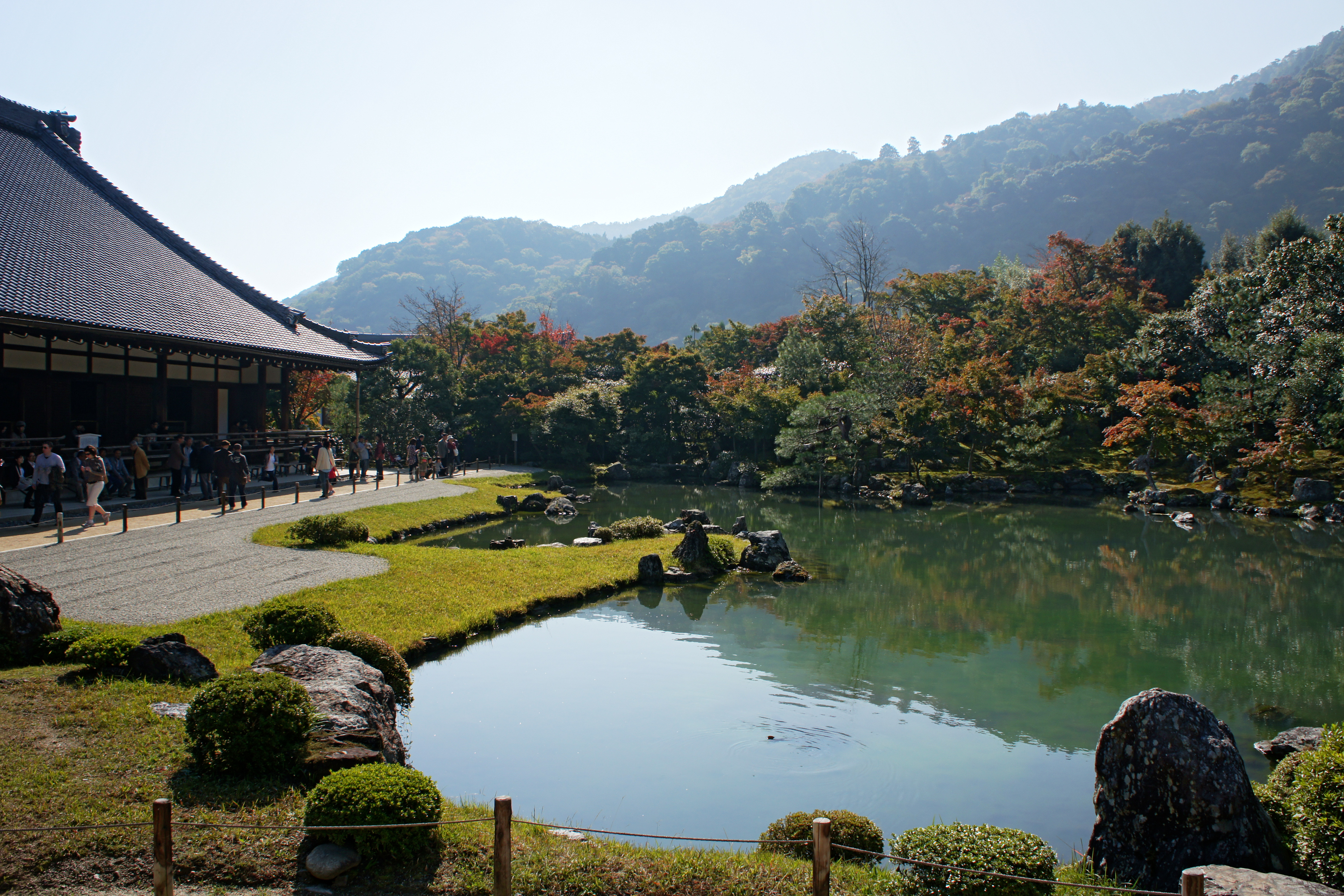
Tenryū-ji Garden in Kyoto (Kaiyū-shiki Garden, completed in the 14th century)

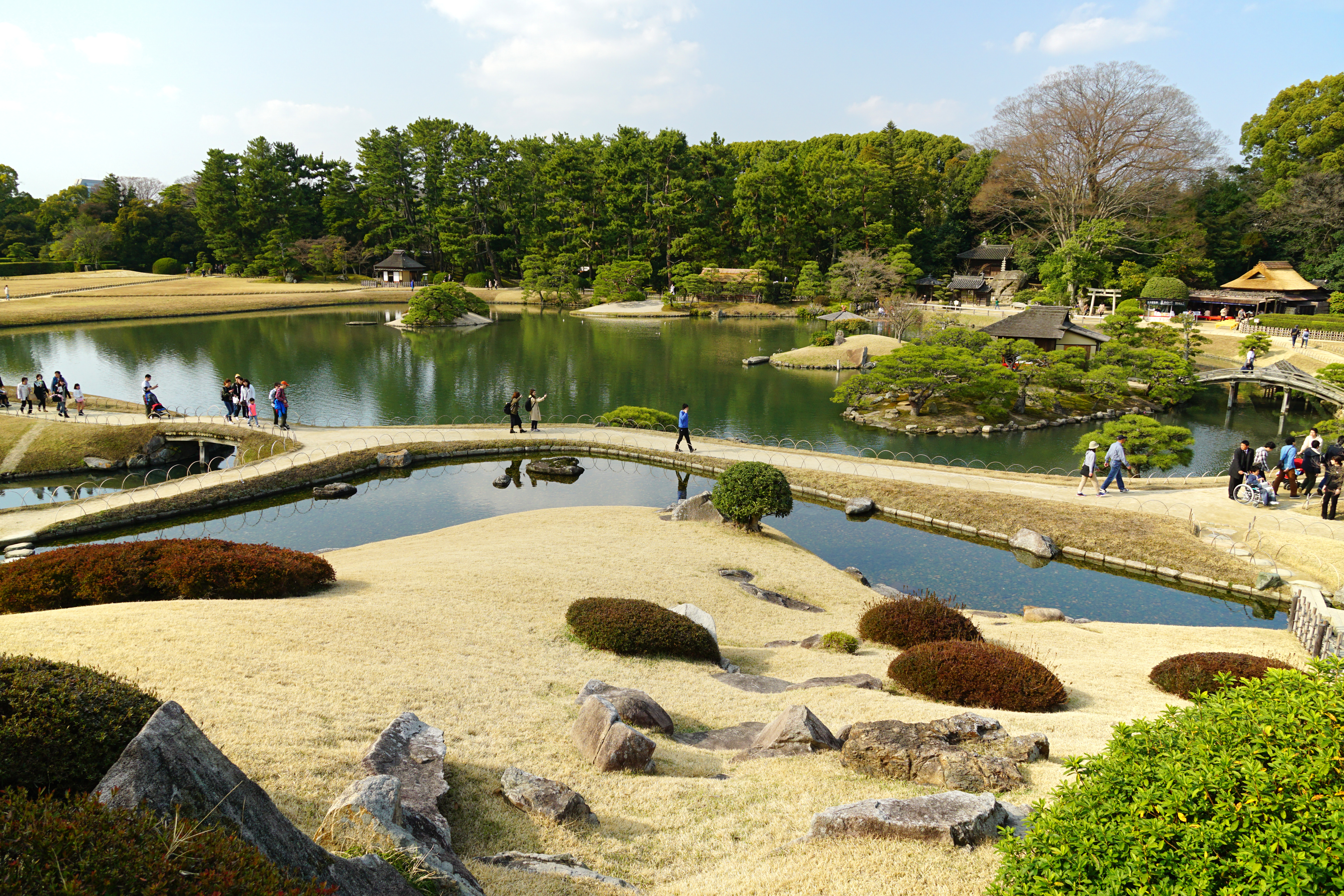
Kōraku-en in Okayama (Kaiyū-shiki Garden, completed in the 17th century)

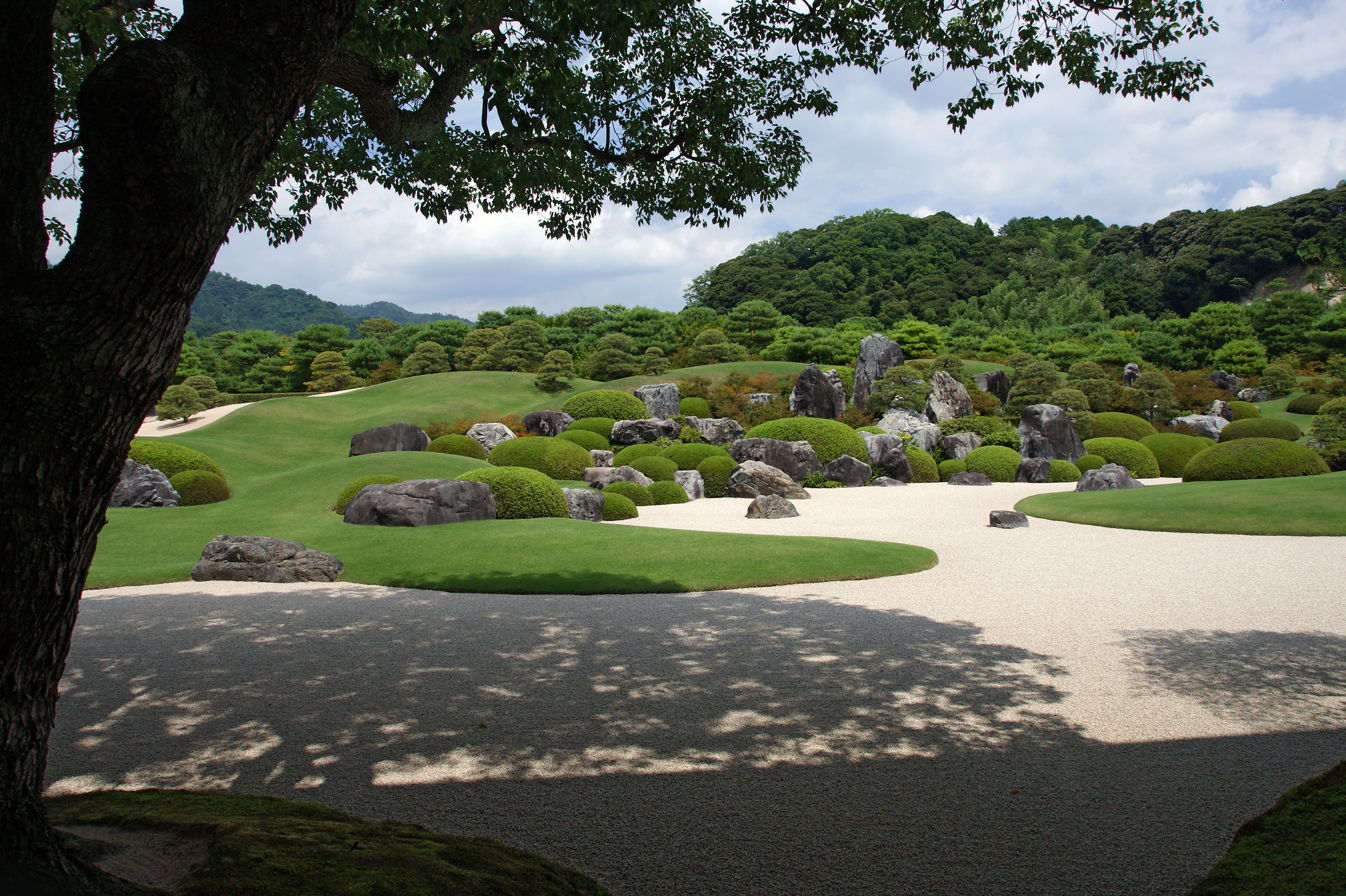
Adachi Museum of Art Garden, Yasugi (Kanshō-shiki Garden, completed in the 20th century)

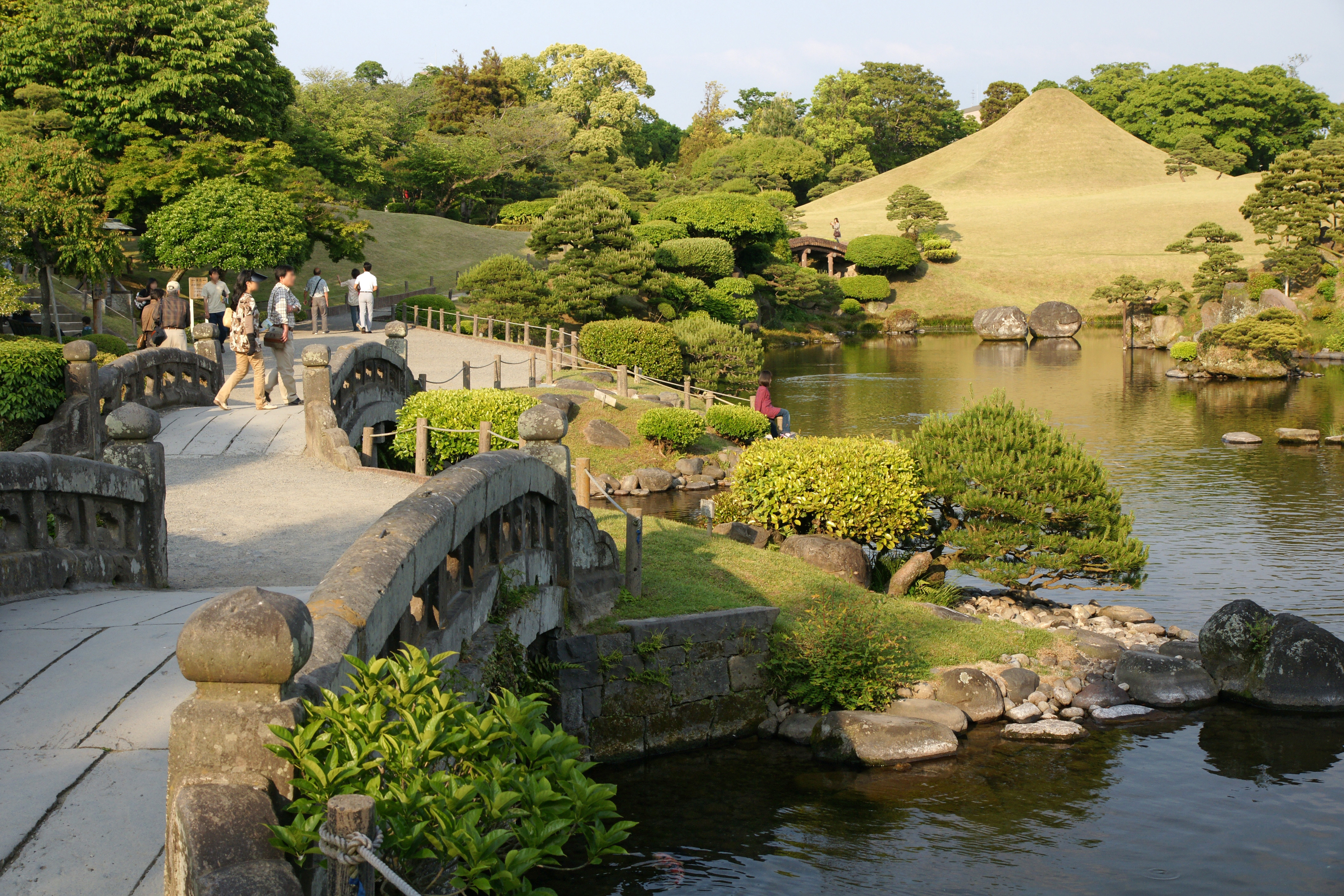
A spacious Japanese garden, Suizen-ji Jōju-en, near Kumamoto Castle

The Minister of Education, Culture, Sports, Science and Technology of the government of Japan designates the most notable of the nation's scenic beauty as Special Places of Scenic Beauty, under the Law for the Protection of Cultural Properties. As of March 2007, 29 sites are listed, more than a half of which are Japanese gardens (boldface entries specify World Heritage Sites):

- Tōhoku region
  - Mōtsū-ji Garden (Hiraizumi, Iwate)
- Kantō region
  - Kairaku-en (Mito, Ibaraki)
  - Rikugi-en (Bunkyō, Tokyo)
  - Kyu Hamarikyu Gardens (Chūō, Tokyo)
- Chūbu region
  - Kenroku-en (Kanazawa, Ishikawa)
  - Ichijōdani Asakura Family Gardens (Fukui, Fukui)
- Kansai region
  - Byōdō-in Garden (Uji, Kyoto)
  - Jisho-ji Garden (Kyoto, Kyoto)
  - Nijō Castle Ninomaru Garden (Kyoto, Kyoto)
  - Rokuon-ji Garden (Kyoto, Kyoto)
  - Ryōan-ji Garden (Kyoto, Kyoto)
  - Tenryū-ji Garden (Kyoto, Kyoto)
  - The garden of Sanbōin in Daigo-ji (Kyoto, Kyoto)
  - The moss garden of Saihō-ji (the "Moss Temple") (Kyoto, Kyoto)
  - Daitoku-ji Garden (Kyoto, Kyoto)
  - The garden of Daisen-in in Daitoku-ji (Kyoto, Kyoto)
  - Murin-an garden, Kyoto, Kyoto
  - Negoro-ji Garden (Iwade, Wakayama)
- Chūgoku region
  - Adachi Museum of Art Garden (Yasugi, Shimane)
  - Kōraku-en (Okayama, Okayama)
  - Matsue Vogel Park (Matsue)
  - Shūraku-en (Tsuyama)
- Shikoku Region
  - Ritsurin Garden (Takamatsu, Kagawa)
  - Nakatsu Banshoen (Marugame, Kagawa)
  - Tensha-en (Uwajima, Ehime)
- Kyushu Region
  - Suizen-ji Jōju-en (Kumamoto, Kumamoto)
  - Sengan-en (Kagoshima, Kagoshima)
- Ryūkyū Islands
  - Shikina-en (Naha, Okinawa)

However, the Education Minister is not eligible to have jurisdiction over any imperial property. These two gardens, administered by Imperial Household Agency, are also considered to be great masterpieces.

- Katsura Imperial Villa
- Shugaku-in Imperial Villa

=== In Taiwan ===
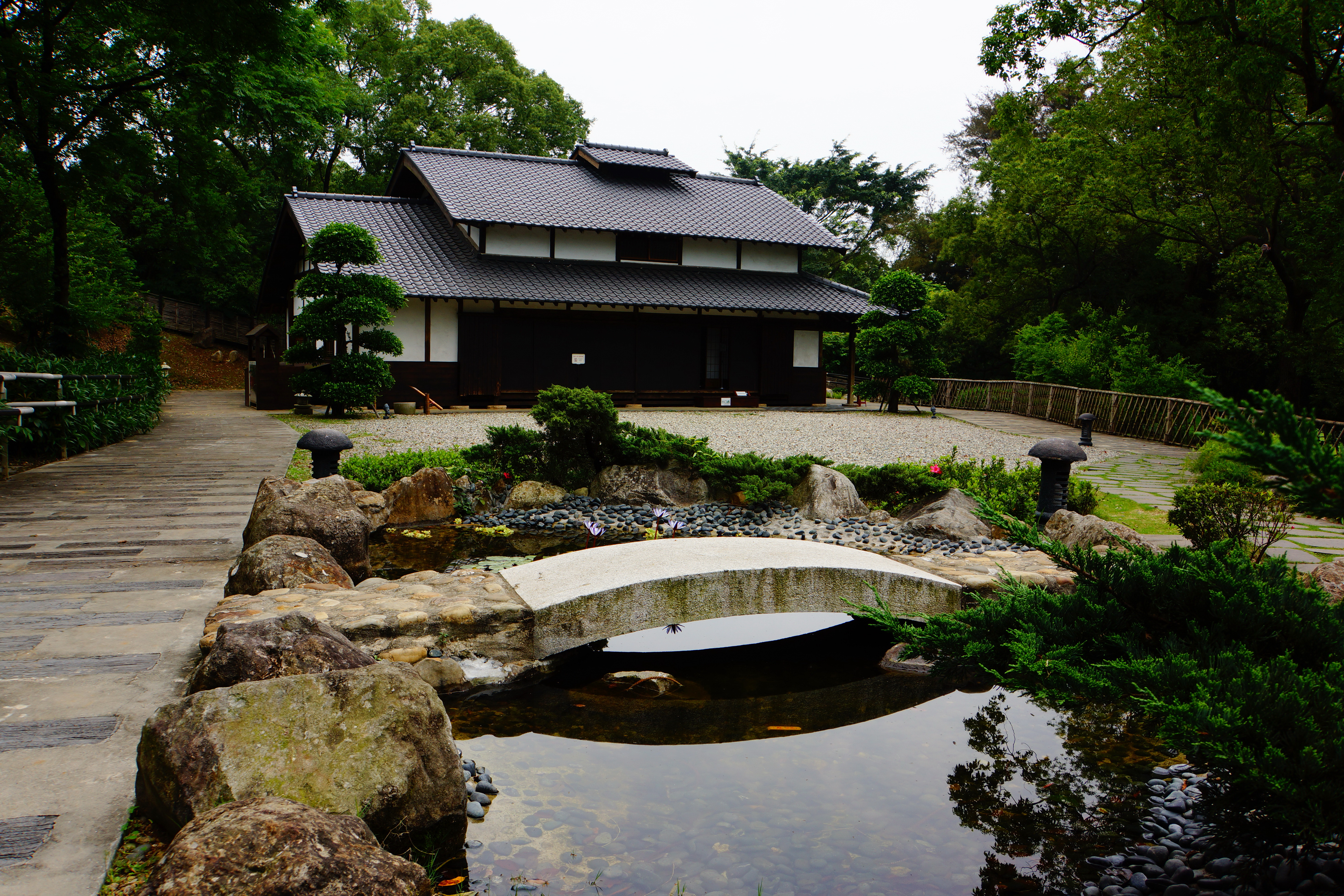
Drop of Water Memorial Hall in New Taipei City, Taiwan

Several Japanese gardens were built during Japanese Taiwan period.

- Taipei Guest House
- Beitou Plum Garden in Beitou, Taipei
- Beitou Museum in Beitou, Taipei
- Nanmon-cho 323 in Zhongzheng District, Taipei
- Drop of Water Memorial Hall in Tamsui, New Taipei City
- Shoyoen in Kaohsiung

=== In English-speaking countries ===
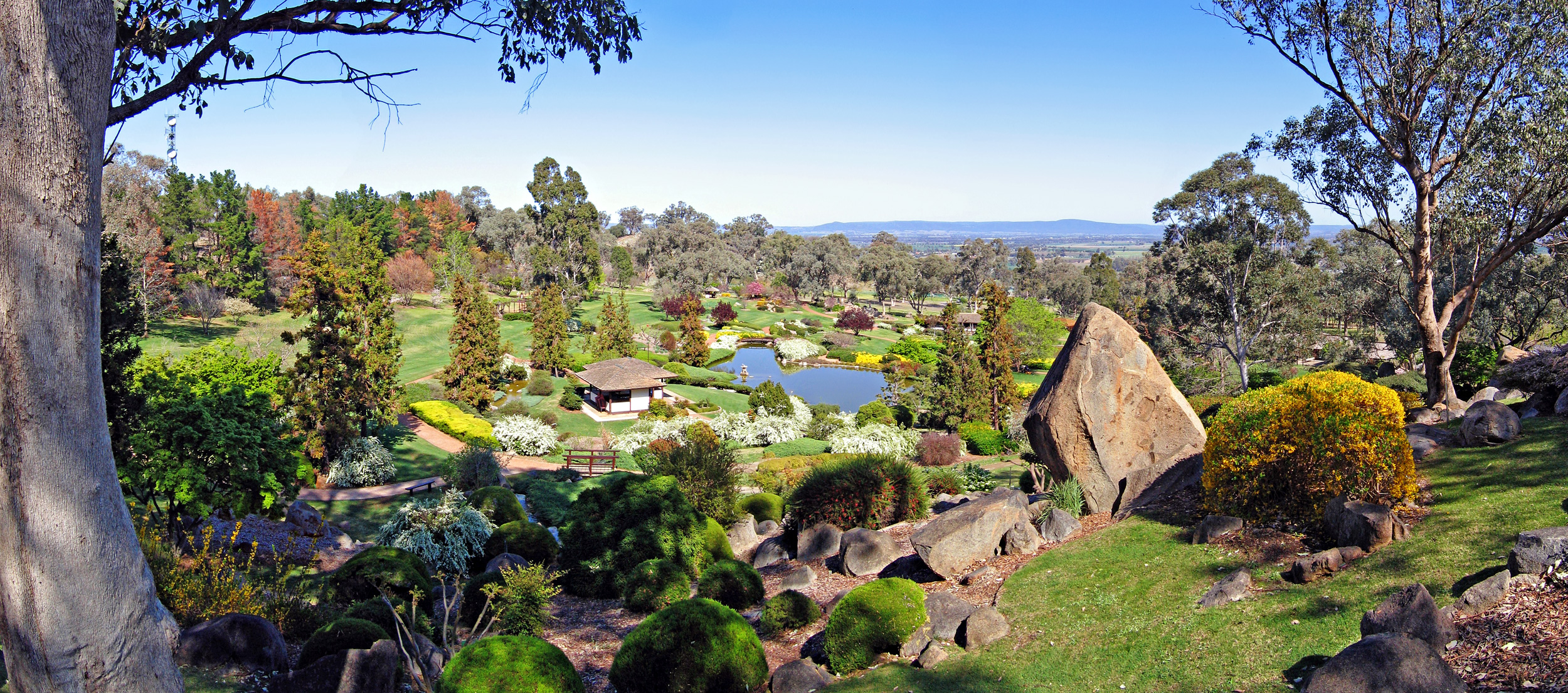
This view from the Symbolic Mountain in the gardens in Cowra, Australia shows many of the typical elements of a Japanese garden.

The aesthetic of Japanese gardens was introduced to the English-speaking world by Josiah Conder's Landscape Gardening in Japan (Kelly & Walsh, 1893). Conder was a British architect who had worked for the Japanese government and other clients in Japan from 1877 until his death. The book was published when the general trend of Japonisme, or Japanese influence in the arts of the West, was already well-established, and sparked the first Japanese gardens in the West. A second edition was required in 1912. Initially these were mostly sections of large private gardens, but as the style grew in popularity, many Japanese gardens were, and continue to be, added to public parks and gardens. Conder's principles have sometimes proved hard to follow:

Robbed of its local garb and mannerisms, the Japanese method reveals aesthetic principles applicable to the gardens of any country, teaching, as it does, how to convert into a poem or picture a composition, which, with all its variety of detail, otherwise lacks unity and intent.

Samuel Newsom's Japanese Garden Construction (1939) offered Japanese aesthetic as a corrective in the construction of rock gardens, which owed their quite separate origins in the West to the mid-19th century desire to grow alpines in an approximation of Alpine scree.

Gardens where involvement of a Japanese designer came closest to resemble the ones found initially in Japan. The work of Taki Handa (and later J. Suzuki) at Cowden Castle, Scotland was notable back in 1907. According to the Garden History Society, Japanese landscape gardener Seyemon Kusumoto was involved in the development of around 200 gardens in the UK. In 1937 he exhibited a rock garden at the Chelsea Flower Show, and worked on the Burngreave Estate at Bognor Regis, and also on a Japanese garden at Cottered in Hertfordshire. The lush courtyards at Du Cane Court – an art deco block of flats in Balham, London, built between 1935 and 1938 – were designed by Kusumoto. All four courtyards there may have originally contained ponds. Only one survives, and this is stocked with koi. There are also several stone lanterns, which are meant to symbolise the illumination of one's path through life; similarly, the paths through the gardens are not straight. Japanese maple, Japanese anemone, cherry trees, evergreens, and bamboo are other typical features of Du Cane Court's gardens.

According to David A. Slawson, many of the Japanese gardens that are recreated in the US are of "museum-piece quality". He also writes, however, that as the gardens have been introduced into the Western world, they have become more Americanized, decreasing their natural beauty.

==== Australia ====
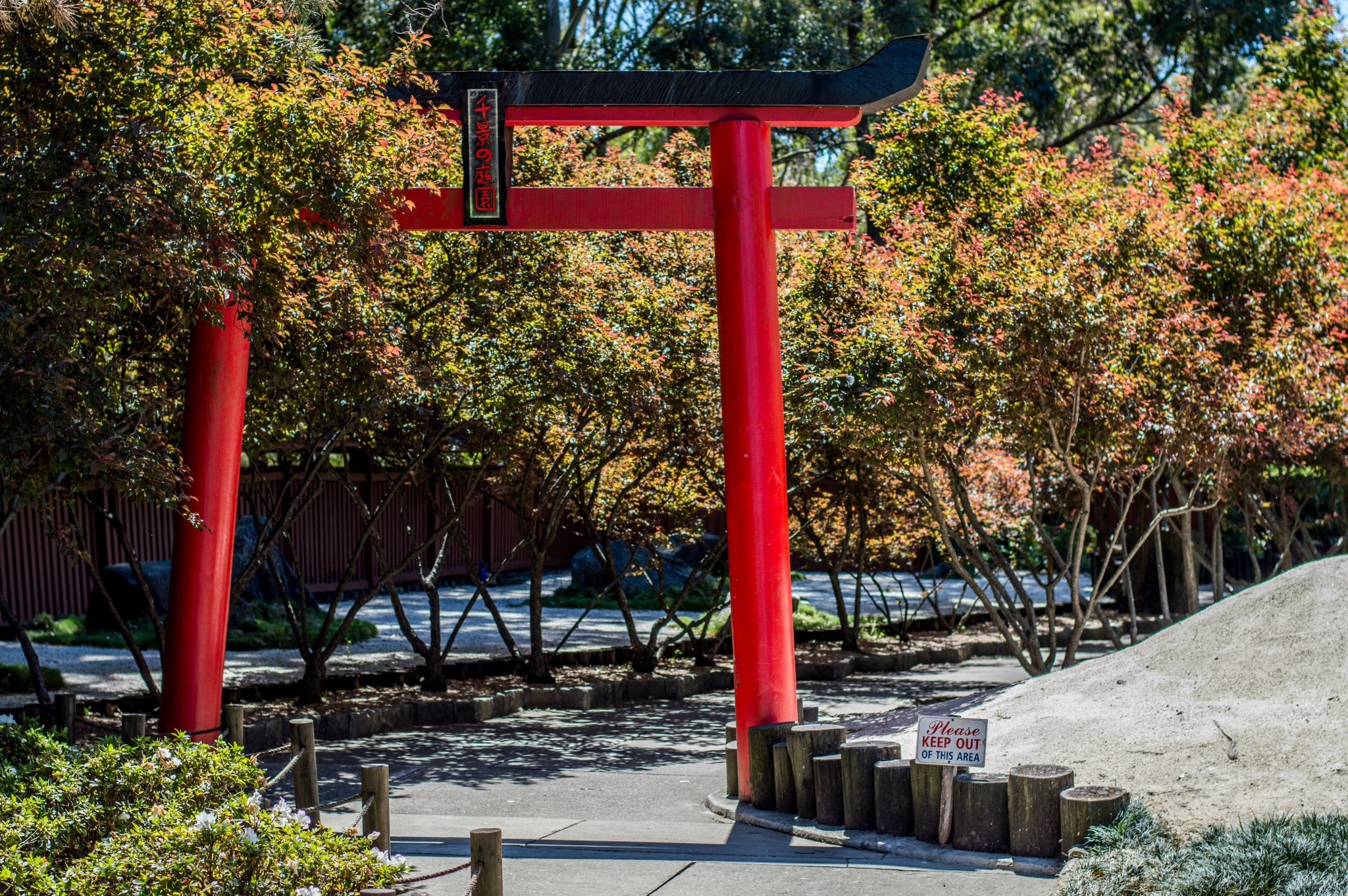
A Japanese zen garden at the Auburn Botanical Gardens in Auburn, Sydney

- Adelaide Himeji Garden, Adelaide
- Auburn Botanical Gardens, Sydney
- Canberra Nara Peace Park in Lennox Gardens, Canberra
- Cowra Japanese Garden and Cultural Centre, Cowra
- Melbourne Zoo, Melbourne
- Nerima Gardens, Ipswich
- "Tsuki-yama-chisen" Japanese Garden, Brisbane
- University of Southern Queensland Japanese Garden, "Ju Raku En", Largest Japanese Gardens in Australia. Toowoomba

==== Canada ====
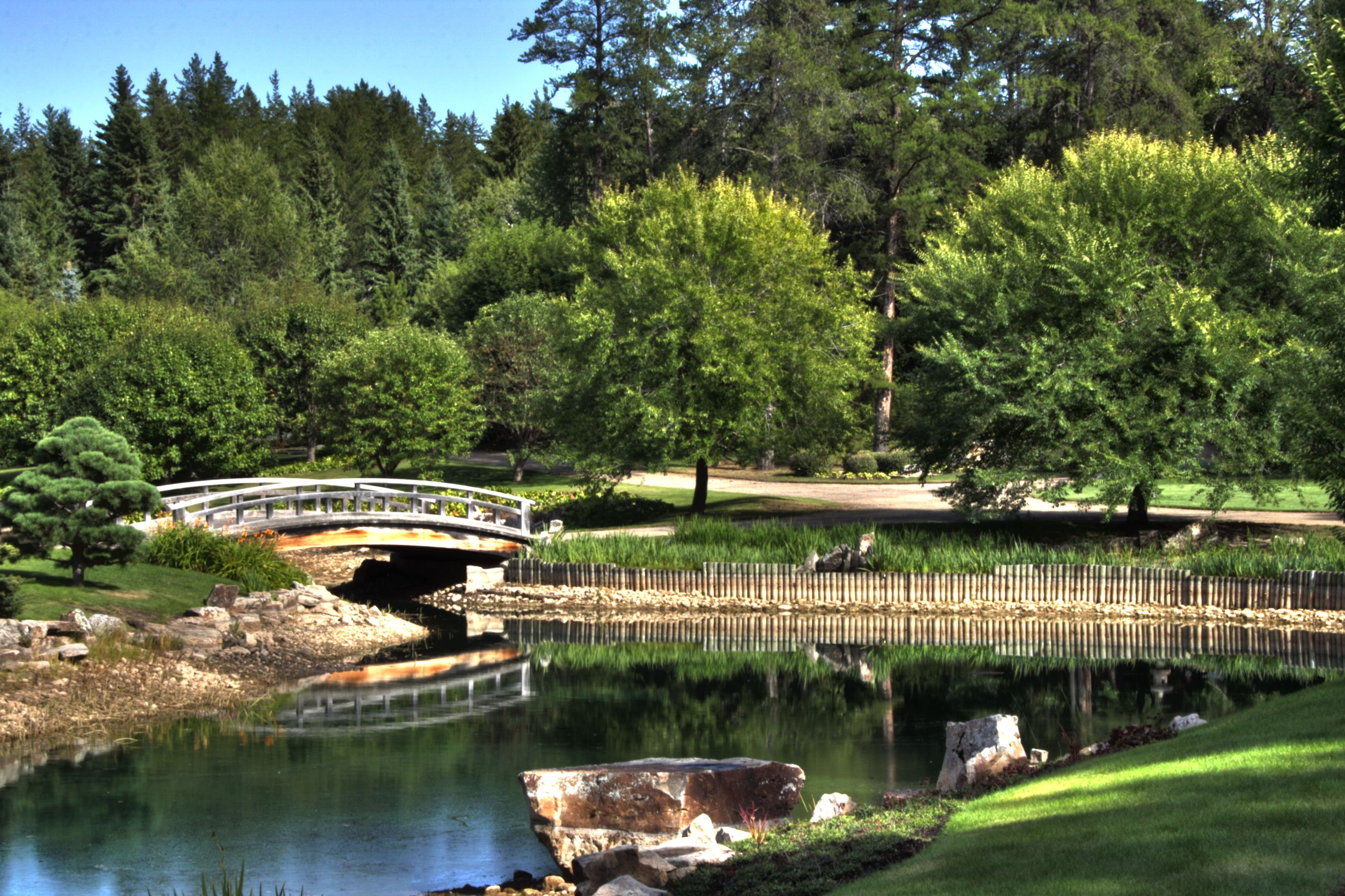
Japanese Garden in the Devonian Botanic Garden, Edmonton, Alberta

- Nitobe Memorial Garden, Vancouver, British Columbia
- The University of Alberta Botanic Garden, Edmonton, Alberta, formerly named the Devonian Botanic Garden, which contains an extensive Japanese garden
- Nikka Yuko Japanese Garden, Lethbridge, Alberta
- The Japanese Garden and Pavilion, Montreal Botanical Garden, Quebec
- Kariya Park, Mississauga, Ontario

==== United Kingdom ====
England

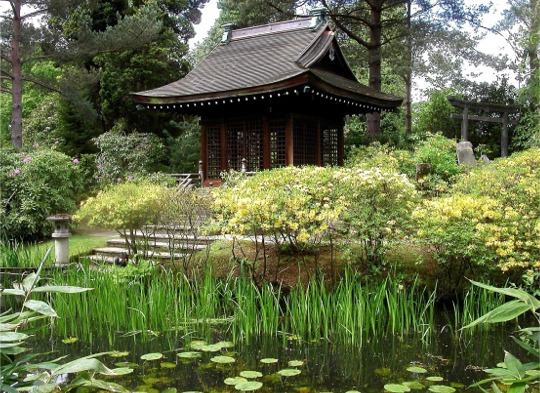
Japanese Garden, Tatton Park Gardens

- Compton Acres, Dorset
- Dartington Hall, Devon
- Hall Park, Leeds
- Harewood House, Leeds
- Holland Park, London
- St Mawgan in Pydar, Cornwall
- Tatton Park, Cheshire
- School of Oriental and African Studies, London

Northern Ireland

- Sir Thomas and Lady Dixon Park, Belfast
- Fujiyama Japanese Garden

Scotland

- Lauriston Castle, Edinburgh – garden opened 2002
- Cowden, Clackmannanshire, - garden opened in 1908 and 2019

==== Ireland ====
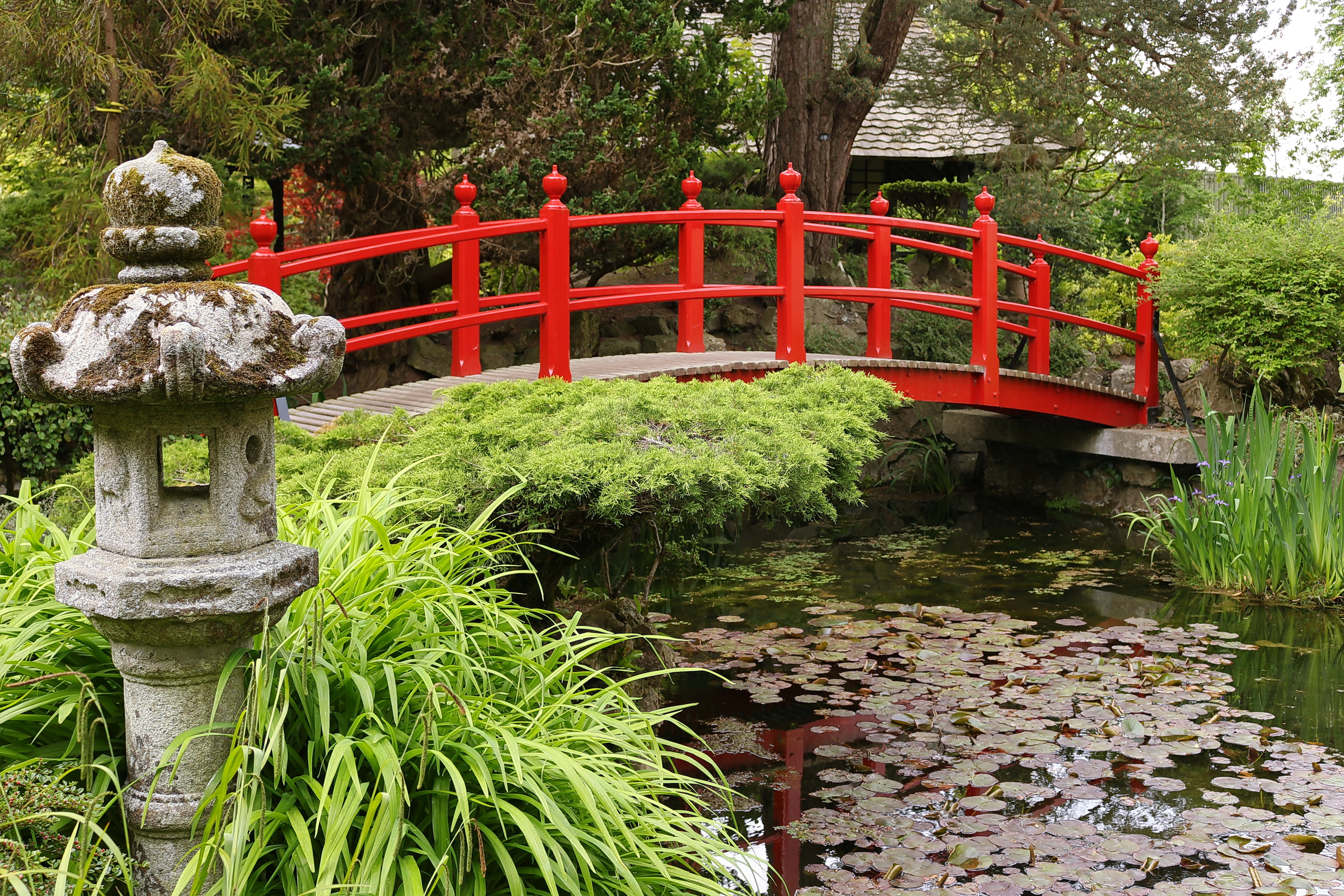
Japanese Garden, Tully, County Kildare. Red lacquered arched bridges are Chinese in origin and seldom seen in Japan, but are often placed in Japanese-style gardens in other countries.

- The Japanese Garden at Tully
- Lafcadio Hearn Japanese Gardens, Tramore, County Waterford

==== United States ====
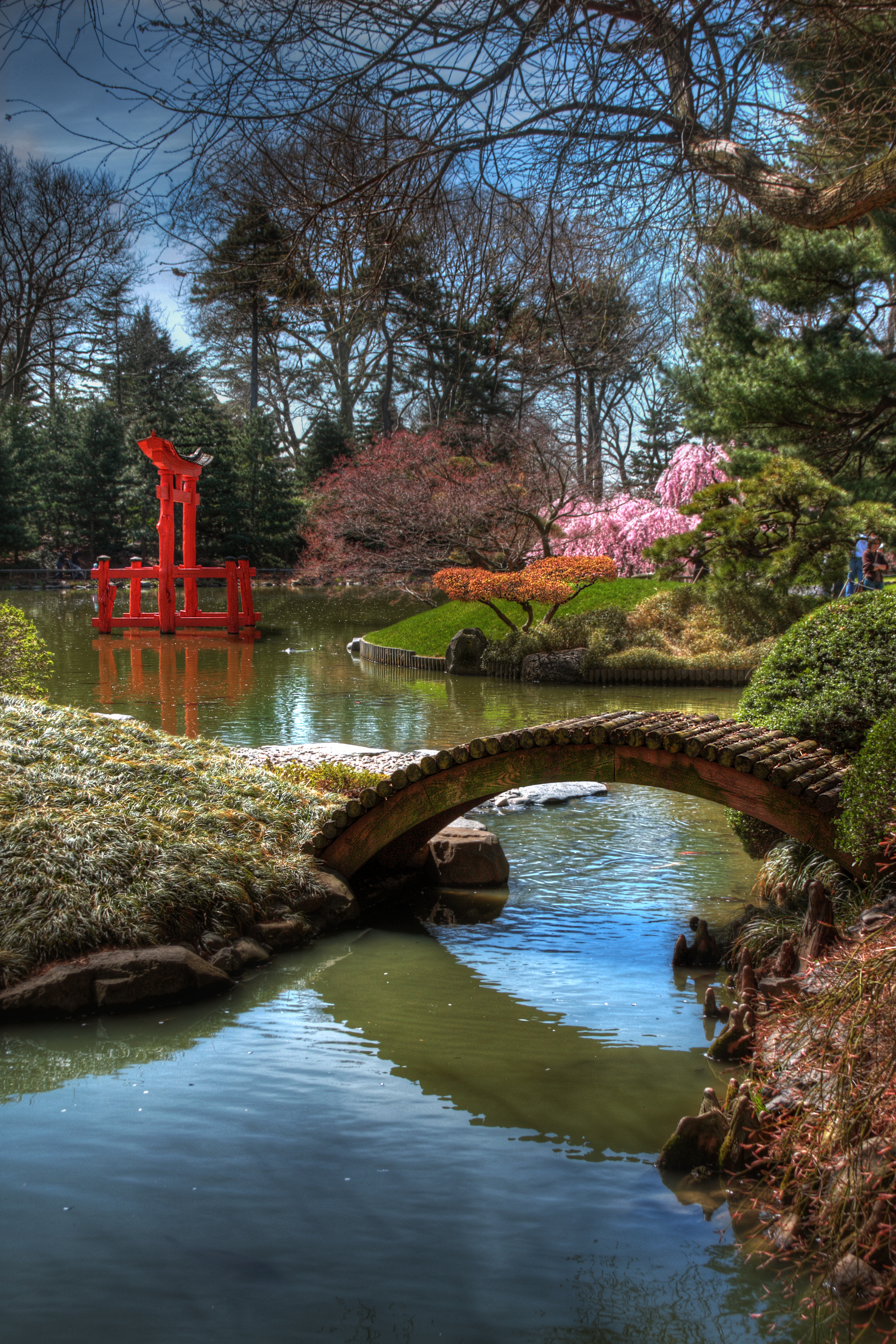
Brooklyn Botanic Garden's Japanese Hill-and-Pond Garden (Brooklyn, New York); designed by Takeo Shiota, was one of the first gardens to be created in an American botanical garden and reportedly the first one to be accessible free of charge.

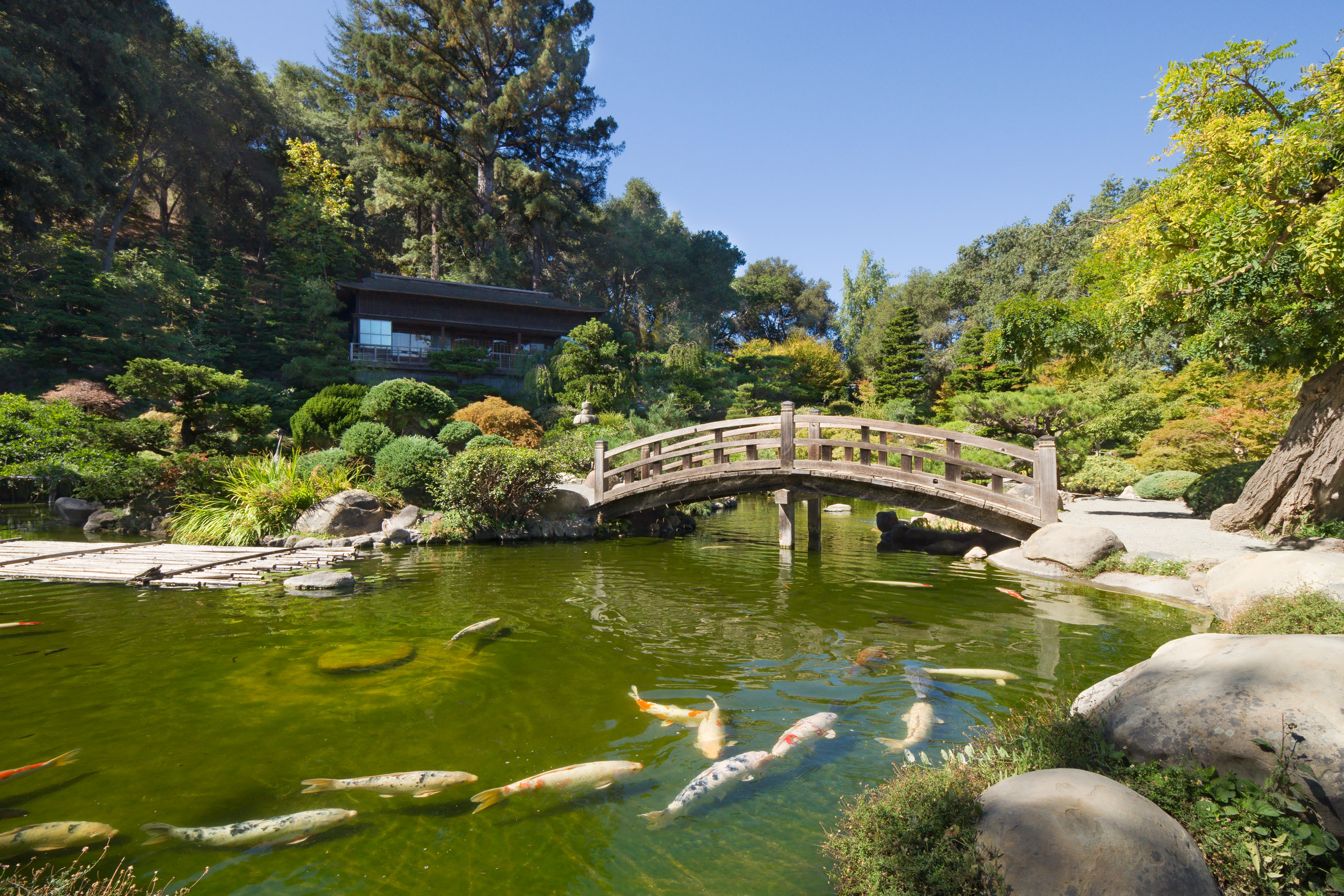
Hakone Gardens in Saratoga, California

- Anderson Japanese Gardens (Rockford, Illinois)
- Japanese Hill-and-Pond Garden at the Brooklyn Botanic Garden (Brooklyn, New York)
- Chicago Botanic Garden (Glencoe, Illinois)
- Earl Burns Miller Japanese Garden at California State University, Long Beach (Long Beach, California)
- Richard & Helen DeVos Japanese Garden at Frederik Meijer Gardens & Sculpture Park (Grand Rapids, Michigan)
- Fort Worth Japanese Garden at the Fort Worth Botanic Garden (Fort Worth, Texas)
- Japanese Tea Garden at Golden Gate Park (San Francisco, California)
- Hakone Gardens (Saratoga, California), used as a filming location for Memoirs of a Geisha
- Hayward Japanese Gardens (Hayward, California), the oldest traditionally designed Japanese garden in California
- Japanese Garden of Peace at the National Museum of the Pacific War (Fredericksburg, Texas)
- Japanese Garden at the Huntington Library (San Marino, California)
- Japanese Friendship Garden (Phoenix, Arizona)
- Japanese Friendship Garden (Balboa Park) (San Diego, California)
- Japanese Friendship Garden (Kelley Park) (San Jose, California)
- Japanese Garden at Hermann Park (Houston, Texas)
- Morikami Museum and Japanese Gardens (Delray Beach, Florida)
- Portland Japanese Garden (Portland, Oregon)
- Seattle Japanese Garden at the Washington Park Arboretum (Seattle, Washington)
- Kubota Garden (Seattle, Washington)
- The Japanese Garden (Los Angeles, California)
- Seiwa-en at the Missouri Botanical Garden (St. Louis, Missouri)
- Shofuso Japanese House and Garden (Philadelphia, Pennsylvania)
- Yuko-En on the Elkhorn (Georgetown, Kentucky)
- Japanese Garden (Ashland, Oregon)

=== In other countries ===
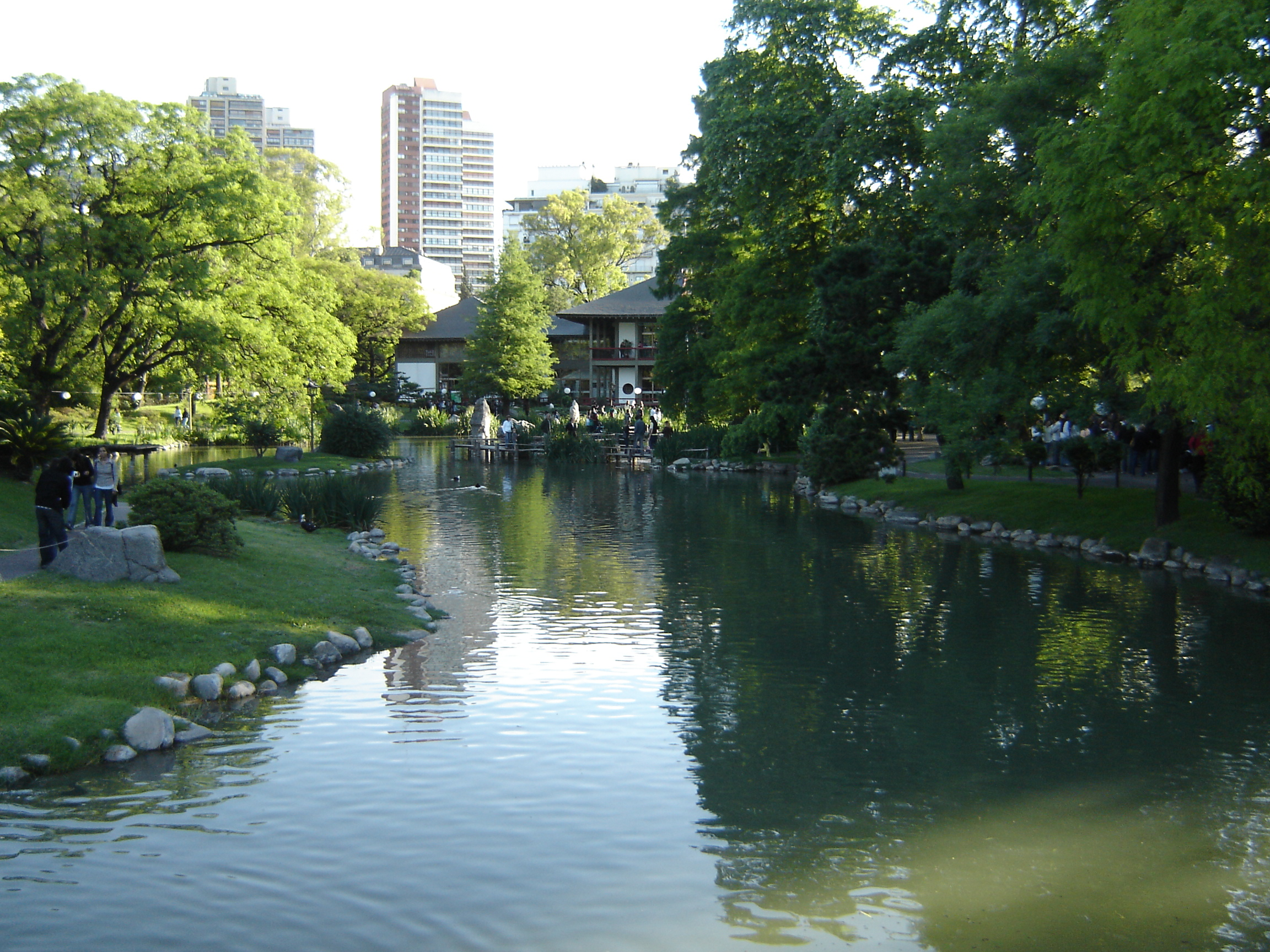
The Buenos Aires Japanese Gardens

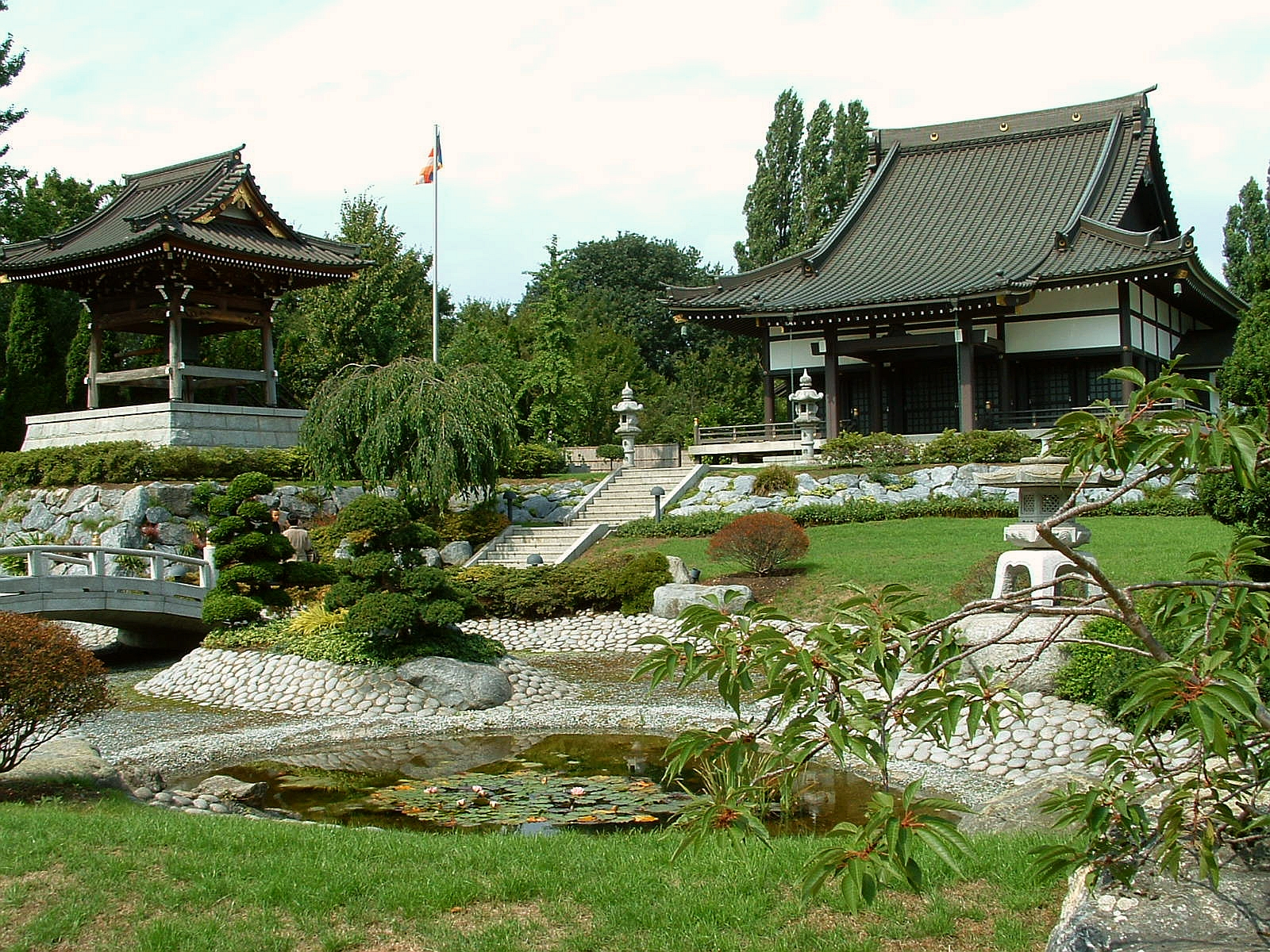
The Japanese Temple Garden at the EKŌ-House of Japanese Culture in Düsseldorf

All seasons close-up of the Tsubo-en (Netherlands) O-karikomi, hako-zukuri topiary

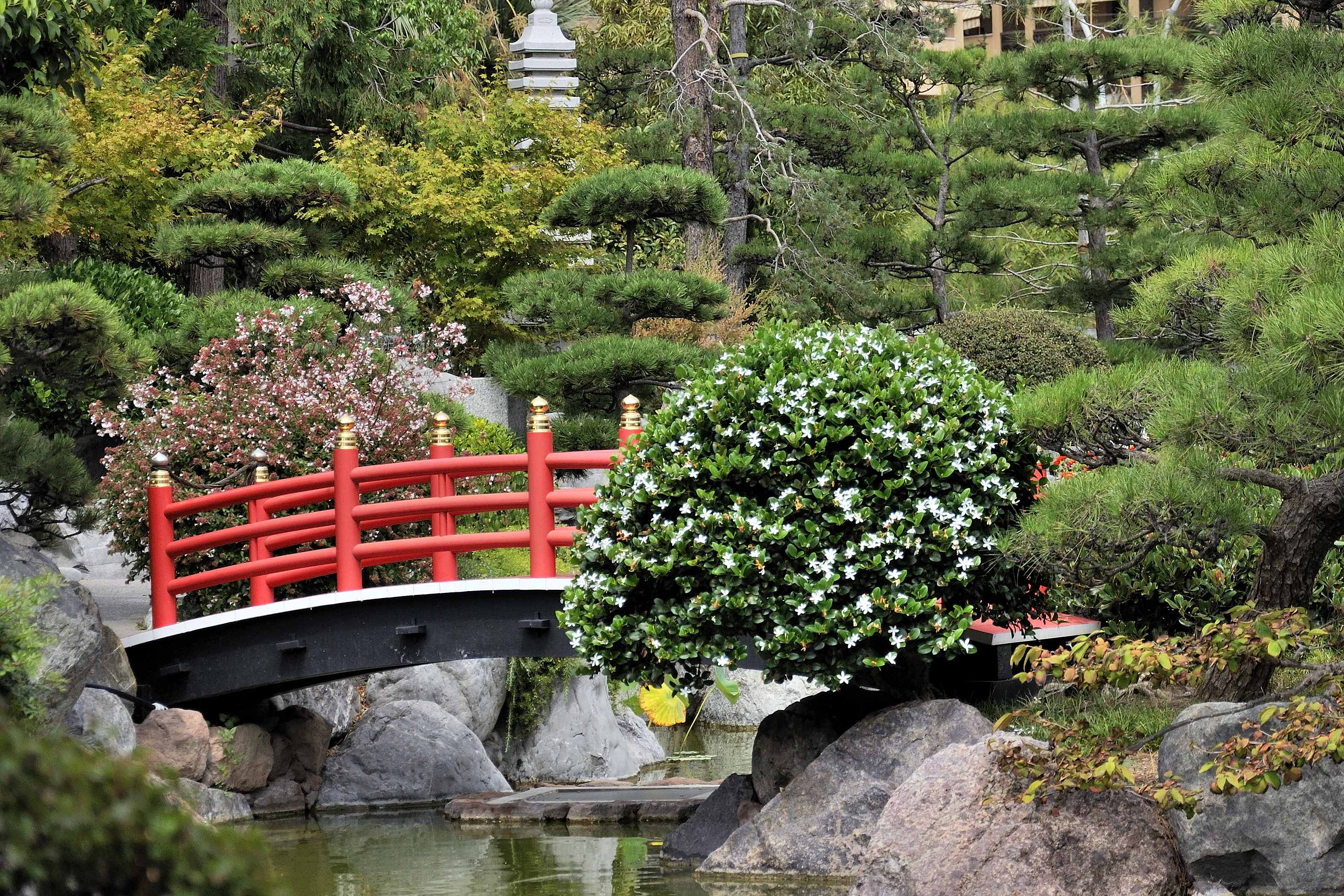
The Japanese Garden in Larvotto, Monaco

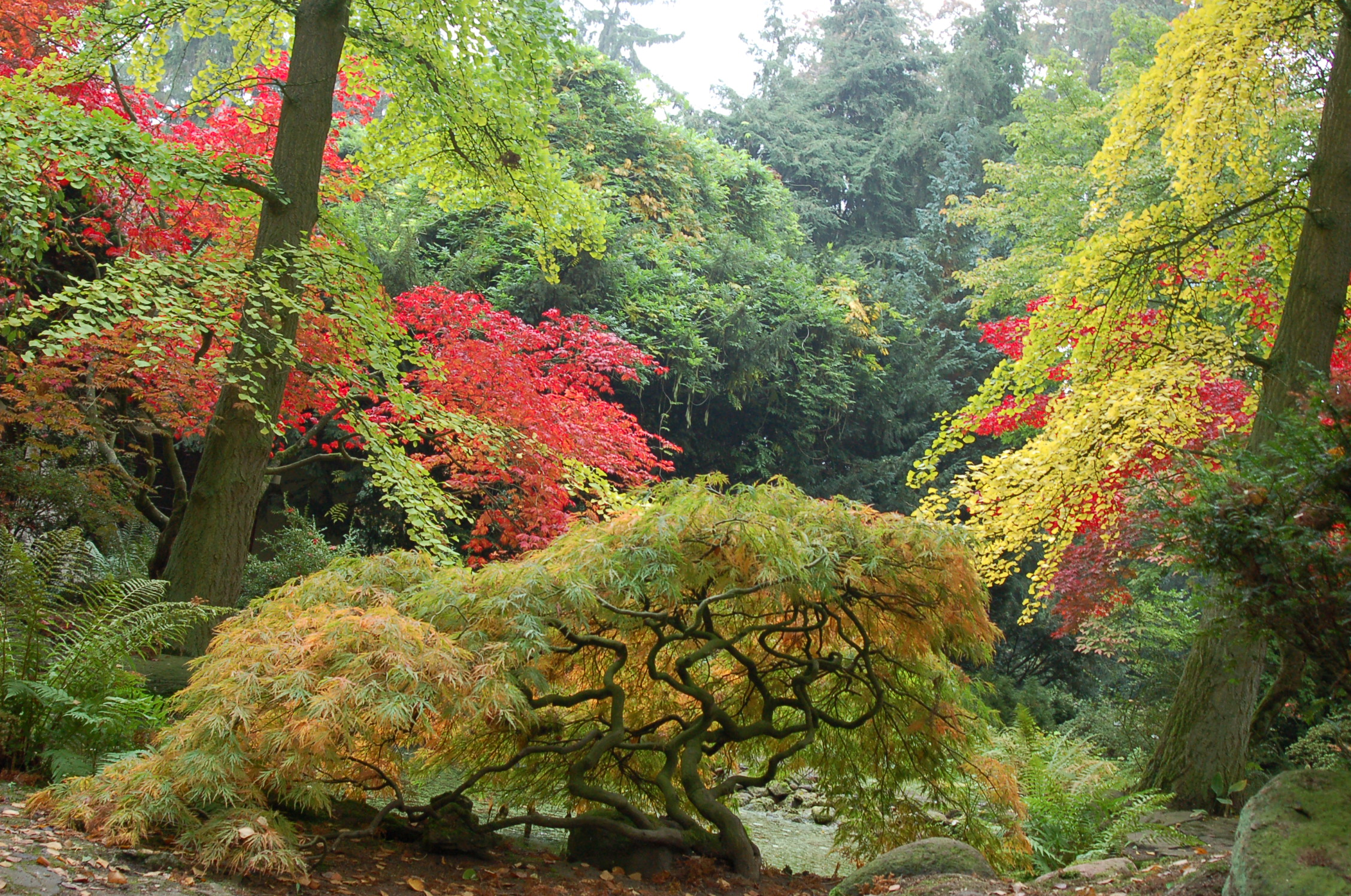
The Japanese Garden in Przelewice, Poland

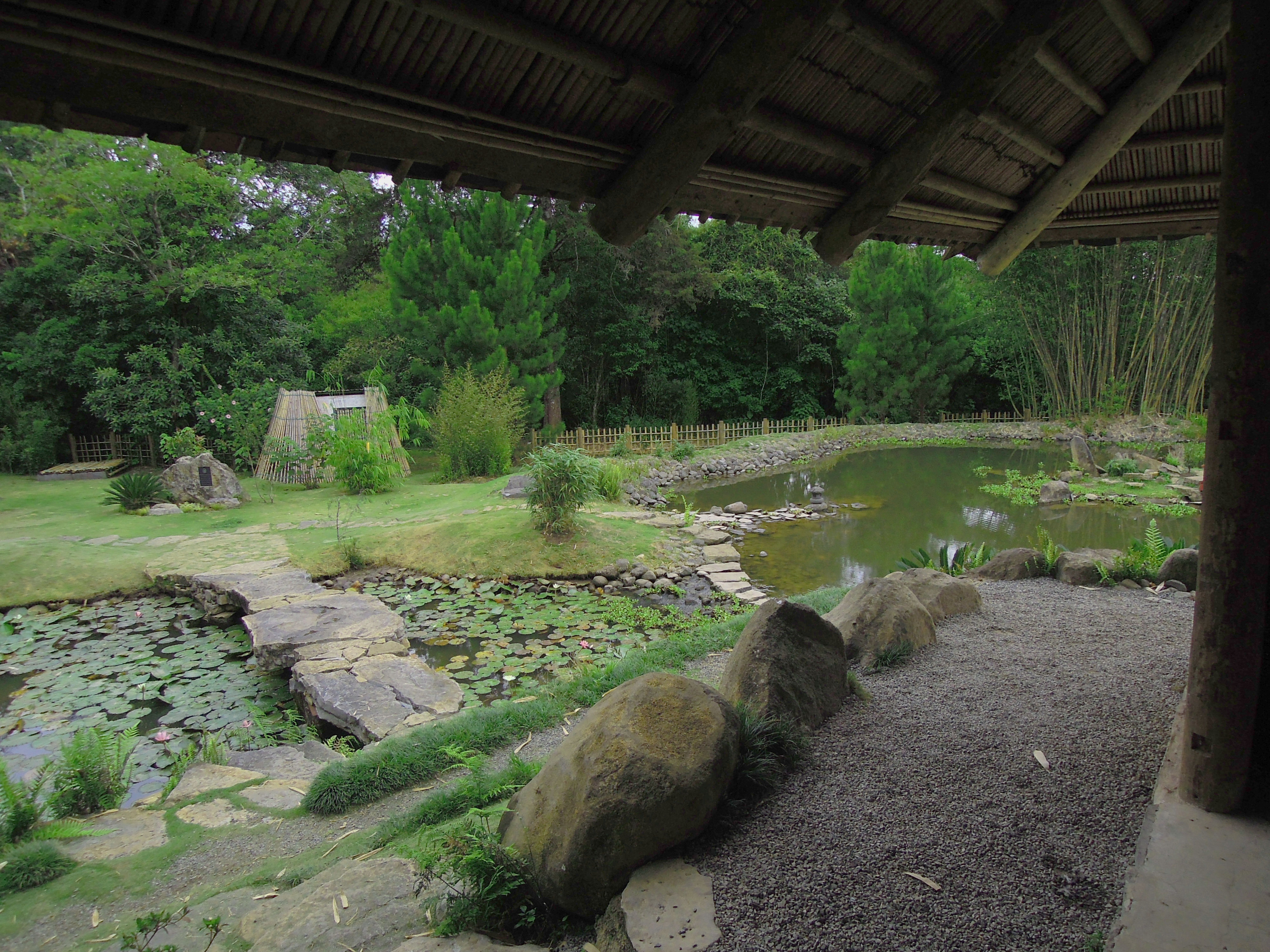
The Japanese Garden in Lankester Botanical Gardens, Costa Rica

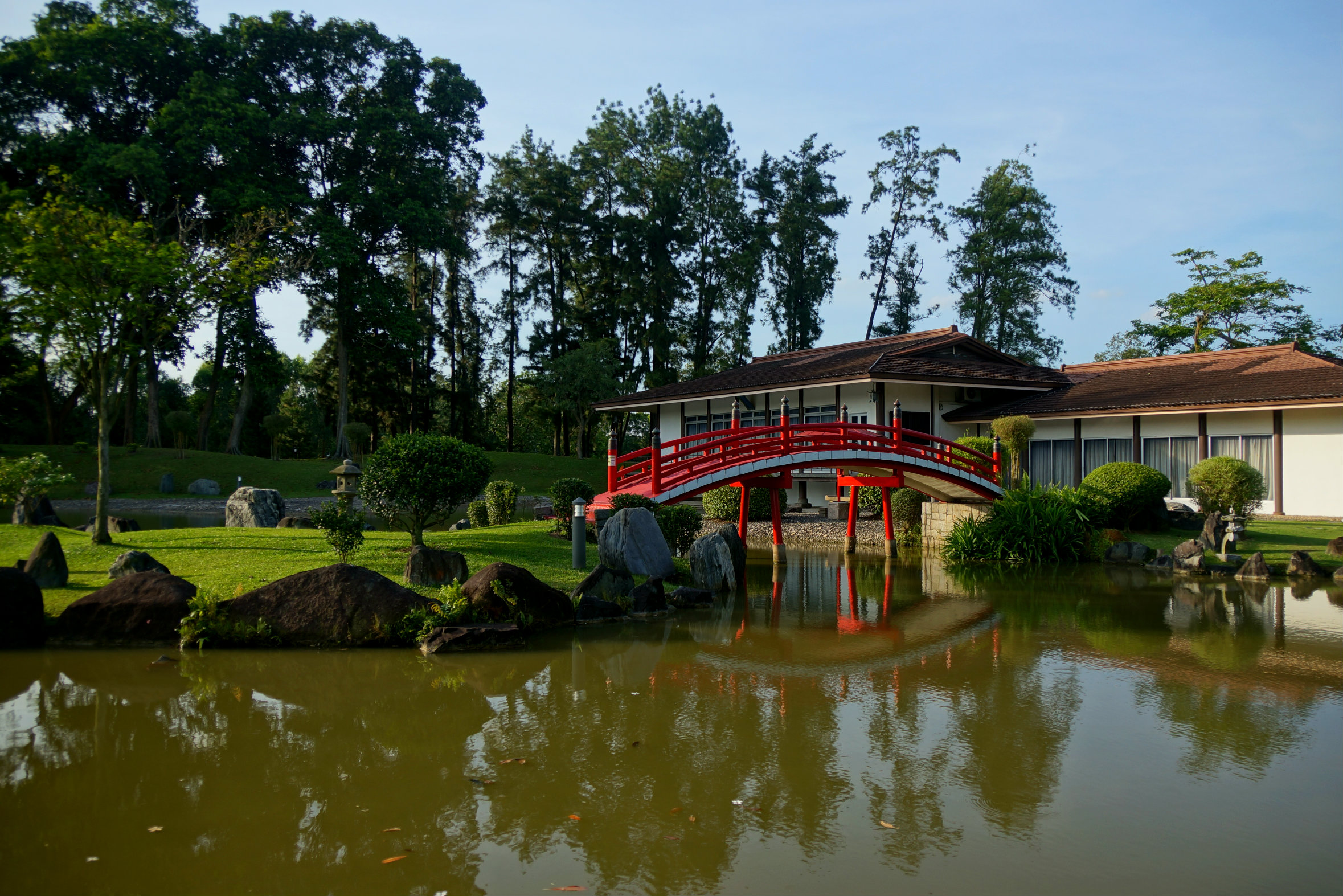
The Japanese Garden, Singapore

- **Argentina**
  - The Buenos Aires Japanese Gardens, of the Fundación Cultural Argentino Japonesa
  - Japanese Garden, Belén de Escobar
- Austria:
  - Setagayapark, Ecke Gallmeyergasse,1190 Vienna – opened 1992 (garden designer Ken Nakajima)
  - The Japanese Garden in Schlosspark Schönbrunn, Vienna – revitalized 1999
- **Belgium**
  - Japanse tuin, Hasselt
  - Japanse tuin, Ostend
  - Jardin japonais Chevetogne Namur
- **Brazil**
  - Parque Santos Dummont, São José dos Campos, São Paulo
  - Bosque Municipal Fábio Barreto, Ribeirão Preto, São Paulo
- Bulgaria:
  - at the Kempinski Hotel Zografski in Sofia; built in 1979 as a large-scale copy of the garden at the Hotel New Otani Tokyo, first and only Japanese Garden in the Balkans until 2004.
- Chile:
  - Jardin Japonés de La Serena (Kokoro No Niwa); It is the largest Japanese garden in South America.
  - Jardín Japonés de Santiago; Built in 1978 and reopened in 1997 by Masahito, Prince Hitachi.
- Costa Rica:
  - Lankester Botanical Gardens, operated by the University of Costa Rica, in Cartago canton
- Czech Republic:
  - Japanese Garden in Prague at Botanical Garden
  - Japanese Zen Garden in Karlovy Vary at Teplà river
- Egypt:
  - Japanese garden in Cairo at Helwan district
- France:
  - The Departmental Museum of Albert Kahn (Musée Albert-Kahn) in Boulogne-Billancourt has two Japanese gardens.
  - Japanese Garden at the UNESCO Head Quarters, created by Isamu Noguchi in 1958
  - Rising sun garden (Jardin du Soleil levant) in the botanical garden of Upper Brittany
  - Jardin japonais Pierre-Baudis, in the Jardin Compans-Cafferelli of Toulouse
- Georgia:
  - in Tbilisi (in Tbilisi Botanical Garden) opened in 2016
- Germany:
  - in Augsburg (in the Botanischer Garten Augsburg)
  - in Bad Langensalza (called "Kōfuku no niwa" and is the 2nd largest Japanese garden in Germany)
  - in Berlin (in the Gärten der Welt Park)
  - in Bielefeld (in borough of Gadderbaum) opened in 2003
  - in Bonn (in Rheinaue park)
  - in Bremen (in Overseas Museum and Botanika)
  - in Cologne (at Museum of East Asian Art)
  - in Dortmund (in Westfalenpark)
  - in Düsseldorf (temple garden of the EKŌ-House of Japanese Culture and Nordpark)
  - in Erfurt (in Egapark)
  - in Freiburg (in Seepark)
  - in Hamburg (in the Planten un Blomen Park)
  - in Hanover (in Stadtpark)
  - in Kaiserslautern (largest Japanese garden in Germany)
  - in Karlsruhe (in Zoological garden)
  - in Leverkusen (in Chempark)
  - in Munich (in the Englischer Garten)
  - in Rostock (in IGA park)
  - in Schwielowsee (Bonsai garden)
  - in Stuttgart (in Schlossgarten)
  - in Trier (called "U Raku En")
  - in Würzburg (called "Ōmi no wa" and is a contribution from its sister city Ōtsu and at Krankenkai)
- Greece:
  - in Athens, established in 2021
- Hungary:
  - on Margaret Island, Budapest
  - in the Budapest Zoo and Botanical Garden
- India:
  - in Moti Jheel, Kanpur
  - in Buddha Park, Indira Nagar, Kalianpur, Kanpur
  - Japanese Garden, Chandigarh
  - Pune-Okayama Friendship Garden, Pune
- Iran:
  - in Tehran, the National Botanical Garden of Iran; established in 1995
- Israel:
  - Kibbutz Heftziba
- Kenya:
  - Japanese Zen garden in Nairobi at Kitisuru district
- Mexico:
  - Masayoshi Ohira Park in Mexico City
  - in Los Colomos, Guadalajara
  - in "Jardines de México" theme park in Cuernavaca
  - in Parque Tangamanga, San Luis Potosi
- Mongolia:
  - Juulchin street cnr Jigjidjav street, Ulaanbaatar, established in 2005 by a Mongolian sumo wrestler
- Monaco:
  - Jardin Japonais, Larvotto
- Netherlands:
  - The Japanse Tuin of Clingendael park
  - The Tsubo-en karesansui garden in Lelystad, a private modern Japanese zen (karesansui meaning "dry rock") garden
  - The Von Siebold Memorial Garden in Leiden
- Nicaragua:
  - Parque Japón Nicaragua, in Managua
- Norway:
  - Japanhagen in Milde, Bergen – opened 2005, part of the botanical garden of the University of Bergen – (landscape architect Haruto Kobayashi)
- Philippines:
  - The Japanese garden at Rizal Park in Ermita, Manila
  - The Japanese garden at Lake Caliraya in Cavinti, Laguna
- Poland:
  - The Japanese Garden in Wrocław – founded 1913, restored 1996–1997, destroyed by flood, restored 1999
  - The Japanese garden in Przelewice – a part of Dendrological Garden in Przelewice founded in 1933
- Romania:
  - in Bucharest, Herăstrău Park
  - in Cluj-Napoca, Cluj-Napoca Botanical Garden
- Russia:
  - The Japanese garden in Moscow – founded 1978, opened 1987 (landscape architect Ken Nakajima)
  - Karesansui garden (枯山水) or Japanese rock garden in Irkutsk – opened 2012 (landscape architect Takuhiro Yamada), part of the Botanic Garden of the Irkutsk State University
- Serbia:
  - The Japanese garden in Botanical Garden Jevremovac – opened 2004 (landscape architects Vera and Mihailo Grbic)
- Singapore:
  - Japanese Garden – a garden island located in Jurong Lake
- South Africa:
  - Japanese Garden in Durban at Athlone district
- Spain:
  - Zen Gardens of the Autonomous University of Barcelona at the faculty of translation and interpretation
- Sweden:
  - Japanska Trädgården in Ronneby Brunnspark, Blekinge
  - The "Japandalen" (Japan Valley) of Gothenburg Botanical Garden
- Turkey:
  - Eskişehir Anadolu University Japanese Botanical Garden
- Uruguay:
  - Jardín Japonés, Montevideo – opened 2001 by Princess Sayako
- Uzbekistan:
  - in Tashkent, at exhibition centre

== See also ==
- Sakuteiki, the oldest Japanese manual on landscape gardening
- Three Great Gardens of Japan
- Roji-en Japanese Gardens
- List of parks and gardens in Tokyo

== Bibliography ==
- Johnson, Hugh, Hugh Johnson on Gardening, 1993, the Royal Horticultural Society/Reed International Books, (ISBN 1-85732-303-3)
- Kuitert, Wybe (2017), Japanese Gardens and Landscapes, 1650–1950, University of Pennsylvania Press, Philadelphia, (ISBN 978-0-8122-4474-8)
- Kuitert, Wybe (2002), Themes in the History of Japanese Garden Art, Hawaii University Press, Honolulu, (Online as PDF) (ISBN 0-8248-2312-5)
- Kuitert, Wybe (1988), Themes, Scenes, and Taste in the History of Japanese Garden Art , Japonica Neerlandica, Amsterdam, (ISBN 90-5063-0219)
- Young, David and Michiko (2005), The Art of the Japanese Garden, Tuttle Publishing, Vermont and Singapore, (ISBN 978-0-8048-3598-5)
- Nitschke, Gunter (1999), Le Jardin japonais – Angle droit et forme naturelle, Taschen publishers, Paris (translated from German into French by Wolf Fruhtrunk), (ISBN 978-3-8228-3034-5)
- Baridon, Michel (1998). Les Jardins- Paysagistes, Jardiniers, Poetes., Éditions Robert Lafont, Paris, (ISBN 2-221-06707-X)
- Murase, Miyeko (1996), L'Art du Japon, La Pochothḕque, Paris, (ISBN 2-253-13054-0)
- Elisseeff, Danielle (2010), Jardins japonais, Ḗditions Scala, Paris, (ISBN 978-2-35988-029-8)
- Klecka, Virginie (2011), Concevoir, Amenager, Decorer Jardins Japonais, Rustica Editions, (ISBN 978-2-8153-0052-0)
- Slawson, David A. (1987), Secret Teachings in the Art of Japanese Gardens, New York/Tokyo: Kodansha
- Yagi, Koji (1982), A Japanese Touch for Your Home. Kodansha
- Miller, P. (2005), "The Japanese Garden: Gateway to the Human Spirit", International Journal of Humanities & Peace, Vol. 21 Issue 1, Retrieved August 3, 2008 from: http://researchport.umd.edu
- Kato, E. (2004), The Tea Ceremony and Women's Empowerment in Modern Japan, RoutledgeCurzon, Retrieved August 3, 2008 from: http://www.netlibrary.com
- Varely, P. (2000), Japanese Culture Fourth Edition, The Maple – Vaile Book Manufacturing Group, Retrieved August 3, 2008 from: http://www.netlibrary.com
- GoJapanGo (2008), Japanese Garden History, GNU Free Documentation License, Retrieved August 2, 2008 from: www.gojapango.com
- Gardens, Japan Guide (1996–2008), Retrieved August 3, 2008 from: http://www.japan-guide.com/
- Kenkyusha's New Japanese–English Dictionary, Kenkyusha Limited, Tokyo 1991, ISBN 4-7674-2015-6
- The Compact Nelson Japanese–English Dictionary, Charles E. Tuttle Company, Tokyo 1999, ISBN 4-8053-0574-6
