= List of national treasures of Japan (residences) =

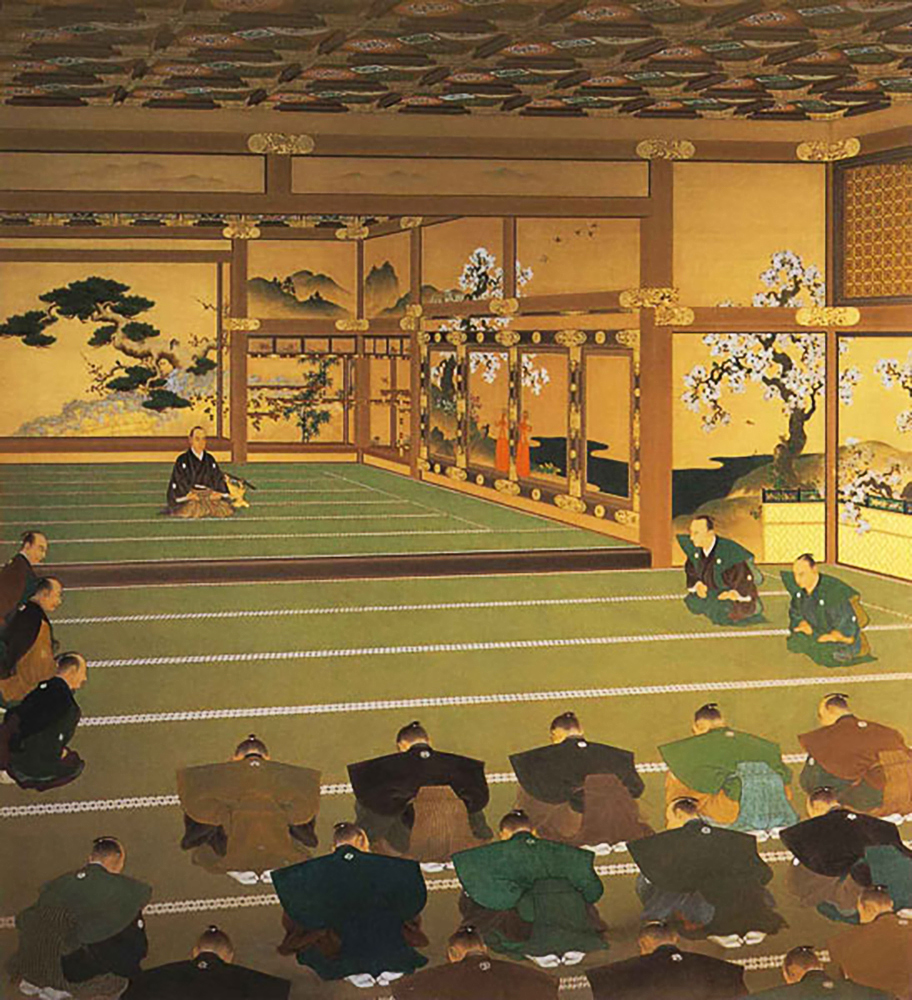
Tokugawa Yoshinobu announcing the restoration of imperial rule in the Kuroshoin of the Ninomaru Palace

The term "national treasure" has been used in Japan to denote cultural properties since 1897. The items are selected by the Ministry of Education, Culture, Sports, Science and Technology based on their "especially high historical or artistic value". This list presents 14 (Note: The national treasure structures of Nijō Castle form a continuous structure (Ninomaru Palace) and are registered as a single national treasure under one registration number. Only in the main treasure table of this article, the single entry is split in parts for readability.) entries of residential structures from 15th-century feudal Muromachi period to the early modern 17th-century Edo period. The structures listed include teahouses, shoin, guest or reception halls and other rooms which are part of Japanese domestic architecture, while most of the structures are located in temples, one is a castle. In 2009, the early 20th century Akasaka Palace was designated as national treasure in the category of "modern residences" (Meiji period and later). Because it is the only national treasure in this category, it is listed together with the 14 pre-Meiji period structures.

The foundations for the design of today's traditional Japanese residential houses with tatami floors were established in the late Muromachi period and refined during the ensuing Momoyama period. Shoin-zukuri, a new architectural style influenced by zen Buddhism, developed during that time from the shinden-zukuri of earlier Heian period palaces and the subsequent residential style favored by the warrior class during the Kamakura period. The term shoin (書院), meaning study or drawing room, has been used to denote reception rooms in residences of the military elite as well as study rooms at monasteries. A shoin has a core area surrounded by aisles, with smaller areas separated by fusuma sliding doors, or shōji partitions constructed of paper on a wooden frame or wooden equivalents, mairado (舞良戸) and sugido (杉戸). A main reception room is characterized by specific features: a recessed alcove (tokonoma); staggered shelves; built-in desks; and ornate sliding doors. Generally the reception room is covered with wall-to-wall tatami, has square beveled pillars, a coved and/or coffered ceiling, and wooden shutters protecting the area from rain (雨戸, amado). The entrance hall (genkan) emerged as an element of residential architecture during the Momoyama period. The oldest extant shoin style building is the Tōgu-dō at Ginkaku-ji from 1485. Other representative examples of early shoin style, also called shuden, include two guest halls at Mii-dera. In the early Edo period, shoin-zukuri reached its peak and spread beyond the residences of the military elite. The more formal shoin-style of this period is apparent in the characteristics of Ninomaru Palace at Nijō Castle as well as the shoin at Nishi Hongan-ji.

The simpler style used in the architecture of tea houses for the tea ceremony developed in parallel with shoin-zukuri. In the 16th century Sen no Rikyū established dedicated "grass hut" (草庵, sōan) style teahouses characterized by their small size of typically two to eight mat, the use of natural materials, and rustic appearance. This teahouse style, exemplified by the Jo-an and Tai-an teahouses, was influenced by Japanese farmhouse style and the shoin style featuring tatami matted floors, recessed alcoves (tokonoma) and one or more ante chambers for preparations.

By the beginning of the Edo period, the features of the shoin and the teahouse styles began to be blended. The result was an informal version of the shoin style, called sukiya-zukuri (数寄屋造). Sukiya-zukuri has the characteristic decorative alcove and shelf, and utilizes woods such as cedar, pine, hemlock, bamboo, and cypress, often with rough surfaces including the bark. Compared to shoin style, roof eaves in the sukiya style bend downward. While the shoin style was suitable for ceremonial architecture, it became too imposing for residential buildings. Consequently, the less formal sukiya style was used for the mansions of the aristocracy and samurai after the beginning of the Edo period. Examples of sukiya style architecture are found at the Katsura Imperial Villa and the Black Study Hall of Nishi Hongan-ji.

== Statistics ==
In total there are 15 structures at ten compounds in five cities. (Note: The Tokyo Akasaka Palace is the only structure in the category of "modern residences" (Meiji period and later). All other structures in this list are much older from the late 15th to early 17th century.) Ten of these structures are located in Kyoto. The compound with most national treasures of the residential building category is Nishi Hongan-ji, with three structures.

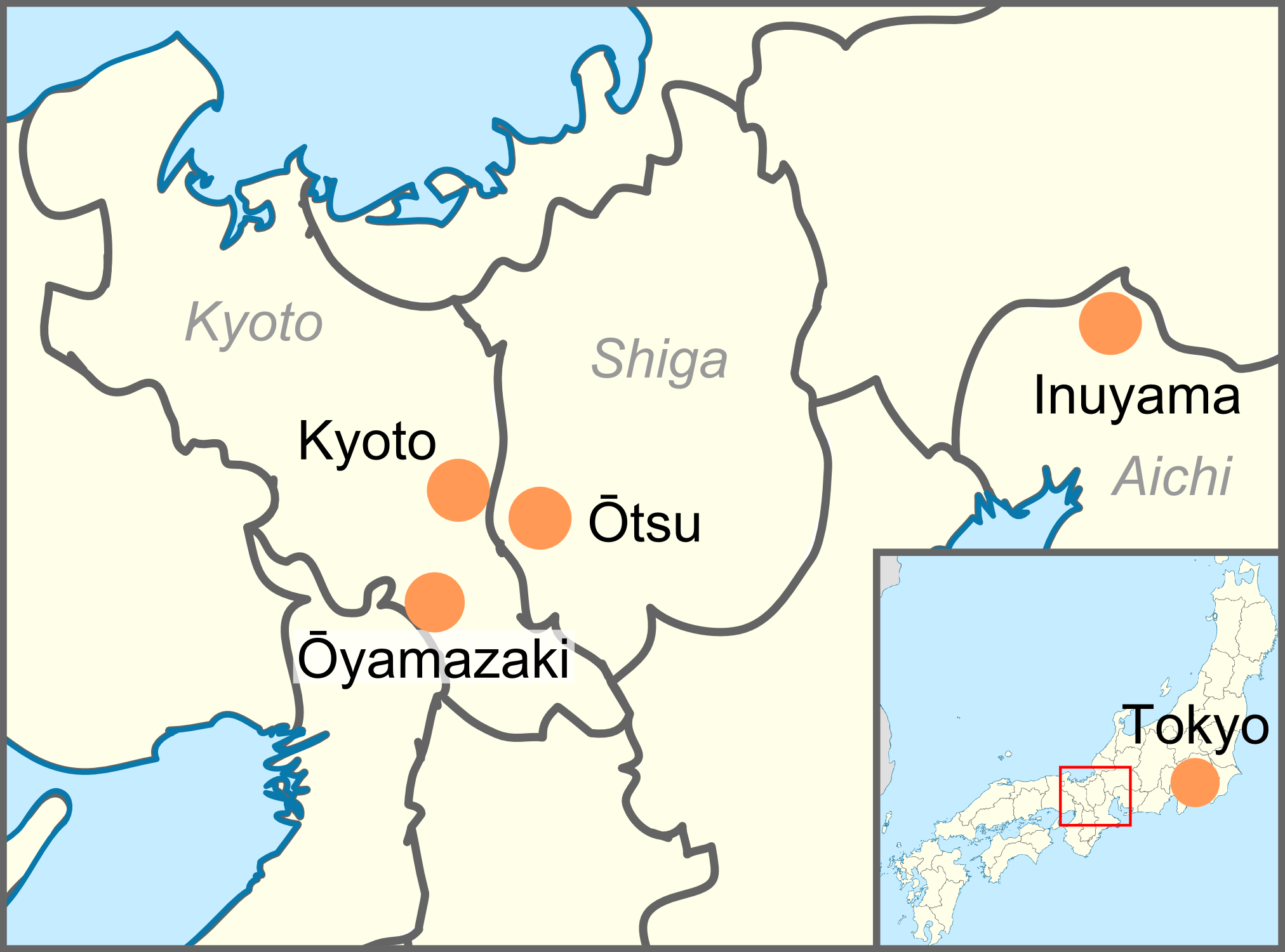
Map showing the location of residential national treasures in Japan

Prefecture	City	National treasures
Aichi	Inuyama	1
Kyoto	Kyoto	10
Kyoto	Ōyamazaki	1
Shiga	Ōtsu	2
Tokyo	Tokyo	1

Compound	National treasures
Ninomaru Palace (Nijō Castle)	1
Nishi Hongan-ji	3
Ginkaku-ji	2
Mii-dera	2
Sanbō-in	2
Ryōkō-in (Daitoku-ji)	1
Myōki-an	1
Tō-ji	1
Urakuen	1
Akasaka Palace	1

Period (Note: If a national treasure was constructed during more than one period, only the oldest period is counted.)	National treasures
Muromachi period	2
Momoyama period	7
Edo period	5
Meiji period	1

== Usage ==
The table's columns (except for Remarks and Image) are sortable pressing the arrows symbols. The following gives an overview of what is included in the table and how the sorting works.

- Name: name of the structure as registered in the Database of National Cultural Properties
- Compound: name of the compound in which the structure is located
- Remarks: architecture and general remarks including:

- size measured in meters or ken (distance between pillars); "m × n" denotes the length (m) and width (n) of the structure, each measured in ken
- architectural style (zukuri) and type of roofing

- Date: period and year of the construction; The column entries sort by year. If only a period is known, they sort by the start year of that period.
- Location: "town-name prefecture-name" and geo-coordinates of the structure; The column entries sort as "prefecture-name town-name".
- Image: picture of the structure; If the image shows more than one structure, the respective structure is indicated by a blue rectangle.

== Treasures ==
Name	Compound	Remarks	Date	Location	Image
Jo-an (如庵)	Uraku-en (有楽苑)	Japanese teahouse, single-storied, irimoya style (Note: (irimoya-zukuri, 入母屋造): a hip-and-gable roof combining a ridge and two gable pediments on the upper part with a hipped roof on all sides in the lower part of the roof) with shake roof, chashitsu with 2.5 + 3/4 mat and a three mat mizuya, built by Oda Uraku, a disciple of Sen no Rikyū	early Edo period, c. 1618	Inuyama, Aichi 35°23′16.66″N 136°56′31.35″E	A small wooden hut with hip-and-gable roof and reddish walls.
Kangakuin Guest Hall (勧学院客殿, kangakuin kyakuden)	Mii-dera	7 × 7, irimoya style, tsumairi style entrance, (Note: (tsumairi, 妻入): entrance in one of the gable ends with the axis of the approach parallel to the ridge of the roof) nokikarahafu gable (Note: (nokikarahafu, 軒唐破風): an undulating Karahafu gable at eave ends) on the front; chūmon (中門) gate: 1 × 1 ken, kirizuma style (Note: (kirizuma-zukuri, 切妻造): a gabled roof with equal lengths from the ridge to the eaves); Both structures are single-storied with shake shingles.	Momoyama period, 1600	Ōtsu, Shiga 35°0′42.4″N 135°51′8.62″E	—
Kōjōin Guest Hall (光浄院客殿, kōjōin kyakuden)	Mii-dera	7 × 6, irimoya style, tsumairi style entrance, facade with a karahafu gable; (Note: (karahafu, 唐破風): an undulating bargeboard flowing downwards from the top center with convex curves on each side that change to concave curves which either level off or turn upward at the ends) chūmon (中門) gate: 1 × 1, kirizuma style Both structures are single-storied with shake shingles.	Momoyama period, 1601	Ōtsu, Shiga 35°0′52.2″N 135°51′9.31″E	—
Kanchiin Guest Hall (観智院客殿, kanchiin kyakuden) (Note: One munafuda (棟札) ridge tag with information on the building's construction is attached to the nomination.)	Tō-ji	12.7 m × 13.7 m (42 ft × 45 ft), tsumairi style entrance, nokikarahafu gable on front; chūmon (中門) gate: 1 × 1, kirizuma style Both structures are single-storied and covered by copper sheeting.	Momoyama period, 1605	Kyoto, Kyoto 34°58′57.48″N 135°44′52.43″E	A small internal garden surrounded by wooden buildings with verandass.
Main drawing room (表書院, omote shoin)	Sanbō-in	Consists of lower, middle and upper rooms; The lower (gedan) room could be used as a Noh stage with the audience seated in the middle and upper rooms. Upper room 15 mat (alcove and shelves), 18 mat, antechamber 27 mat, entrance from all four sides, single-storied, irimoya style, spring pavilion (泉殿, izumidono) in kirizuma style, sangawarabuki (Note: (sangawarabuki, 桟瓦葺): a roof tile combining a broad concave tile with a semi-cylindrical convex tile into one tile. The tile is square undulating from concave to convex.) tile roof, entrance porch on west side with a karahafu gable and covered with hinoki cypress bark; The veranda and detached room in the southwest show the adoption of shinden-zukuri.	Momoyama period, 1598	Kyoto, Kyoto 34°57′7.46″N 135°49′10.43″E	
Karamon (唐門)	Sanbō-in	3 × 2 gate with entrance through the central ken (6.27 m × 2.60 m (20.6 ft × 8.5 ft)) and karahafu gables; Also called Chokushimon (gate for imperial messengers), was entirely black-lacquered with four large chrysanthemum and paulownia motifs, covered with hinoki cypress bark	Momoyama period, 1598	Kyoto, Kyoto 34°57′6.3″N 135°49′8.95″E	A small wooden roofed gate with chrysanthemum motifs and Chinese style gables on the side.
Silver Pavilion (銀閣, ginkaku)	Ginkaku-ji	East and west: 8.2 m (27 ft), north: 7.0 m (23.0 ft), south: 5.9 m (19 ft), two-storied: first floor in shoin-zukuri style, second floor in Chinese temple style with a window with an ogee-type pointed top with a series of S-like curves on either side of the peak (katōmado) and a Chinese sliding door; Roof in hōgyō style (Note: (hōgyō-zukuri, 宝形造): a pyramid shaped roof over a square building) with shake shingles, bronze phoenix on the roof facing east, building originally called Kannonden (観音殿)	Muromachi period, 1489	Kyoto, Kyoto 35°1′35.54″N 135°47′52.94″E	A two-storied wooden building with white walls in the lower part, wooden walls in the upper part and a pyramid shaped roof.
Tōgu-dō (東求堂)	Ginkaku-ji	6.9 m × 6.9 m (23 ft × 23 ft), single-storied, irimoya style, covered with hinoki cypress bark, Buddhist hall of Ashikaga Yoshimasa with two Buddhist altar rooms and two other rooms; oldest extant shoin-zukuri style building	Muromachi period, 1485	Kyoto, Kyoto 35°1′36.79″N 135°47′54.43″E	A single-storied wooden building with a hip-and-gable roof, white walls and wooden sliding doors.
Retainers' room (遠侍, tōzamurai) and Entrance Hall (車寄, kurumayose)	Ninomaru Palace (Nijō Castle)	Entrance Hall: 5 × 3, hinoki cypress bark roofing Retainers' room: 8 × 8, hongawarabuki roofing (Note: (hongawarabuki, 本瓦葺): a tile roof composed of flat broad concave tiles and semi-cylindrical convex tiles covering the seams of the former); Both structures are single-storied, irimoya style.	early Edo period, 1626	Kyoto, Kyoto 35°0′47.7″N 135°45′0.75″E	Wooden building with a large hip-and-gable roof, white walls and wooden sliding doors. A small wooden structure with a hip-and-gable roof, white walls and metal ornaments on the gable is located in front of a large building with hip-and-gable roof, white walls and chrysanthemum motifs on the gable.
Reception Room (式台, shikidai)	Ninomaru Palace (Nijō Castle)	Dimensions: 3 (front), 5 (back), 4 (right), 6 (left) ken, single-storied, irimoya style with hongawarabuki roofing	early Edo period, 1626	Kyoto, Kyoto 35°0′48.09″N 135°44′59.78″E	Wooden building with a hip-and-gable roof, white walls and wooden sliding doors.
Great Hall (大広間, ōhiroma)	Ninomaru Palace (Nijō Castle)	Dimensions: 7 (front), 5 (back), 8 (right), 7 (left) ken, single-storied, irimoya style with hongawarabuki roofing	early Edo period, 1626	Kyoto, Kyoto 35°0′48.68″N 135°44′58.84″E	Wooden building with a large hip-and-gable roof and white walls. The gable is decorated with a chrysanthemum symbol.
Japanese fern-palm chamber (蘇鉄之間, sotetsu-no-ma)	Ninomaru Palace (Nijō Castle)	Dimensions: 1 (front), 3 (back), 8 (right), 9 (left) ken, single-storied, irimoya style with hongawarabuki roofing, connecting the kuroshoin with the ōhiroma	early Edo period, 1626	Kyoto, Kyoto 35°0′49.44″N 135°44′58.55″E	—
Black study room (黒書院, kuroshoin)	Ninomaru Palace (Nijō Castle)	Dimensions: 7 (front), 8 (back), 6 (right), 8 (left) ken, single-storied, irimoya style with hongawarabuki roofing	early Edo period, 1626	Kyoto, Kyoto 35°0′49.91″N 135°44′57.85″E	Wooden building with a large hip-and-gable roof and white walls.
White study room (白書院, shiroshoin) (Note: An attached room and the connecting corridor between shiroshoin and kuroshoin are included in the nomination.)	Ninomaru Palace (Nijō Castle)	6 × 6, single-storied, irimoya style with hongawarabuki roofing	early Edo period, 1626	Kyoto, Kyoto 35°0′51.07″N 135°44′57.76″E	Wooden building with a hip-and-gable roof and white walls.
Black study hall (黒書院, kuroshoin) and Denrō gallery (伝廊, denrō)	Nishi Honganji	Black study hall: length 6 ken (front side), 7 ken (back side), width 4 ken (left side), 6 ken (right side), two-storied, yosemune style (Note: (yosemune-zukuri, 寄棟造): a hipped roof where the front and back are trapezoidal and the sides triangular in shape; in Japan generally used for buildings of less importance) with shake shingles Denrō gallery: 4 × 2, single-storied, ryōsage style (Note: (ryōsage-zukuri, 両下造): a gable roof without gable pediments because other structures connect to it) with shake shingles	early Edo period, 1657	Kyoto, Kyoto 34°59′28.5″N 135°45′4.24″E	
Shoin (書院): Meeting room (対面所, taimenjo) and White study room (白書院, shiroshoin)	Nishi Honganji	38.5 m × 29.5 m (126 ft × 97 ft), single-storied, irimoya style, tsumairi style entrance; "wet veranda", (Note: (nure-en, 濡縁): shallow veranda outside of the sliding storm doors which is open to the elements even if the eaves have a long overhang) hongawarabuki roof	early Edo period, 1618	Kyoto, Kyoto 34°59′27.24″N 135°45′3.51″E	Tatami matted room with a large scale wall painting of a court scene. Three tatami matted rooms separated by sliding doors decorated with bird and plant motifs.
Flying Cloud Pavilion (飛雲閣, hiunkaku)	Nishi Honganji	South and north side: 25.8 m (85 ft), east side: 11.8 m (39 ft), west side: 12.5 m (41 ft), three-storied with shake shingles; 1st floor: shoin-zukuri, study room (招賢殿, shōkenden), room of eight scenes (八景之間, hakkei no ma), veranda and tea ceremony room (ikujaku (憶昔)); karahafu gable on one side and irimoya style roof on opposite side; 2nd floor: room of great poets (歌仙之間, kasen no ma) (with paintings of 36 great poets on the wooden doors and walls), mezzanine floor, lightly railed veranda; convex hip and gable roof with undulating bargeboards on three sides; 3rd floor: 8 mat, with ogee shaped windows; hōgyō style roof	Momoyama period, 1587–1614	Kyoto, Kyoto 34°59′26.01″N 135°45′8.78″E	A three-storied wooden building with decreasing floor size with increasing level. The lowest level has white walls, the upper two have wooden walls. There is a veranda on the second level.
Tai-an (待庵)	Myōki-an (妙喜庵)	3 m × 3.3 m (9.8 ft × 10.8 ft), 2 mat chashitsu, 1 mat anteroom (次の間, tsugi-no-ma) with an itadatami (板畳) board, (Note: A board placed in the part of a room that can not be covered by a standard-size tatami.) hearth cut into the host's mat; single-storied, kirizuma style with shake shingles, attached pent roof over hardpacked earthen floor above the entrance; oldest extant teahouse in Japan, designed by Sen no Rikyū	Momoyama period, 1582	Ōyamazaki, Kyoto	
Shoin (書院)	Ryōkō-in (竜光院) (Daitoku-ji)	6 × 4, single-storied, yosemune style; four rooms with ten (with attached alcove), eight, six and 4.5 tatami mats, spacious veranda, with a 4.5 + 3/4 mat chashitsu called mittan-seki (密庵席); constructed by Kuroda Nagamasa	early Edo period, chashitsu from Kan'ei era	Kyoto, Kyoto	—
Former Crown Prince's Palace (旧東宮御所, kyūtōgūgosho)	State Guesthouse Akasaka Palace (迎賓館赤坂離宮, geihinkan akasaka rikyū)	Neo-Baroque style, designed by Katayama Tokuma, former residence of Crown Prince Haru-no-miya Yoshihito (明宮嘉仁), the later Emperor Taishō	late Meiji period, 1909	Tokyo 35°40′48.93″N 139°43′43.29″E	A large palace built of white stone in neo-baroque style. The facade is adorned with colons.
