= Jo-an =

Teahouse in Aichi Prefecture, Japan

Coordinates: 35.38799°N 136.94235°E

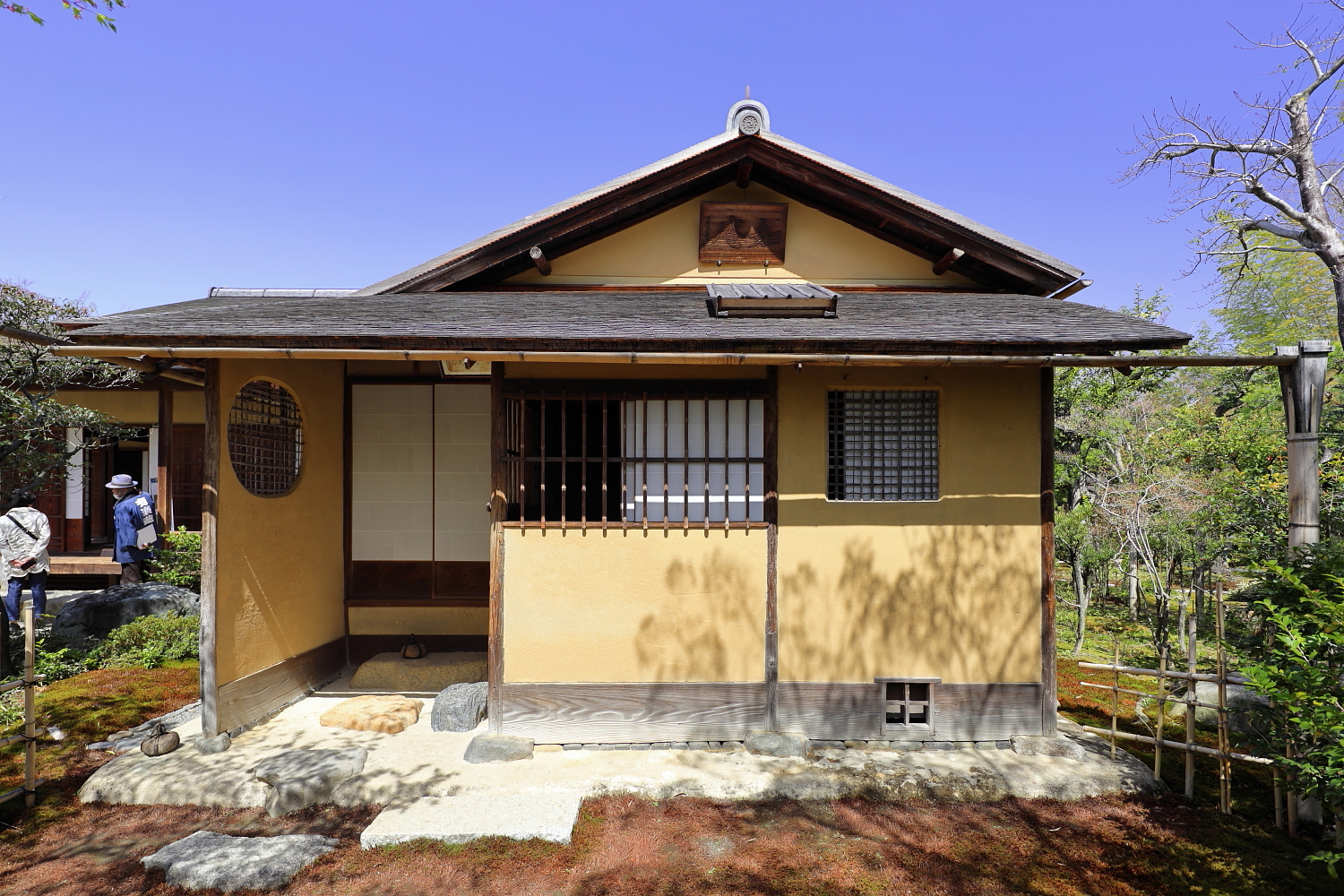
Jo-an tea house dating to the 17th century, a National Treasure of Japan

Jo-an (如庵) is a seventeenth-century Japanese teahouse (chashitsu) located in Inuyama, Aichi Prefecture. Jo-an is said to be one of the three finest teahouses in Japan and has been in its current location in Inuyama since 1972. It was designated a National Treasure in 1951.

== History ==
Jo-an was originally built around 1618 in Kennin-ji, Kyoto, for Oda Urakusai, the younger brother of daimyō Oda Nobunaga and a disciple of tea ceremony master Sen no Rikyū. Jo-an has been relocated a number of times, but since 1972 has formed part of the Urakuen gardens in Inuyama, Aichi Prefecture, part of the historic Owari Province which the Oda clan ruled starting in the 15th century.

== Architecture ==
The layout of Jo-an

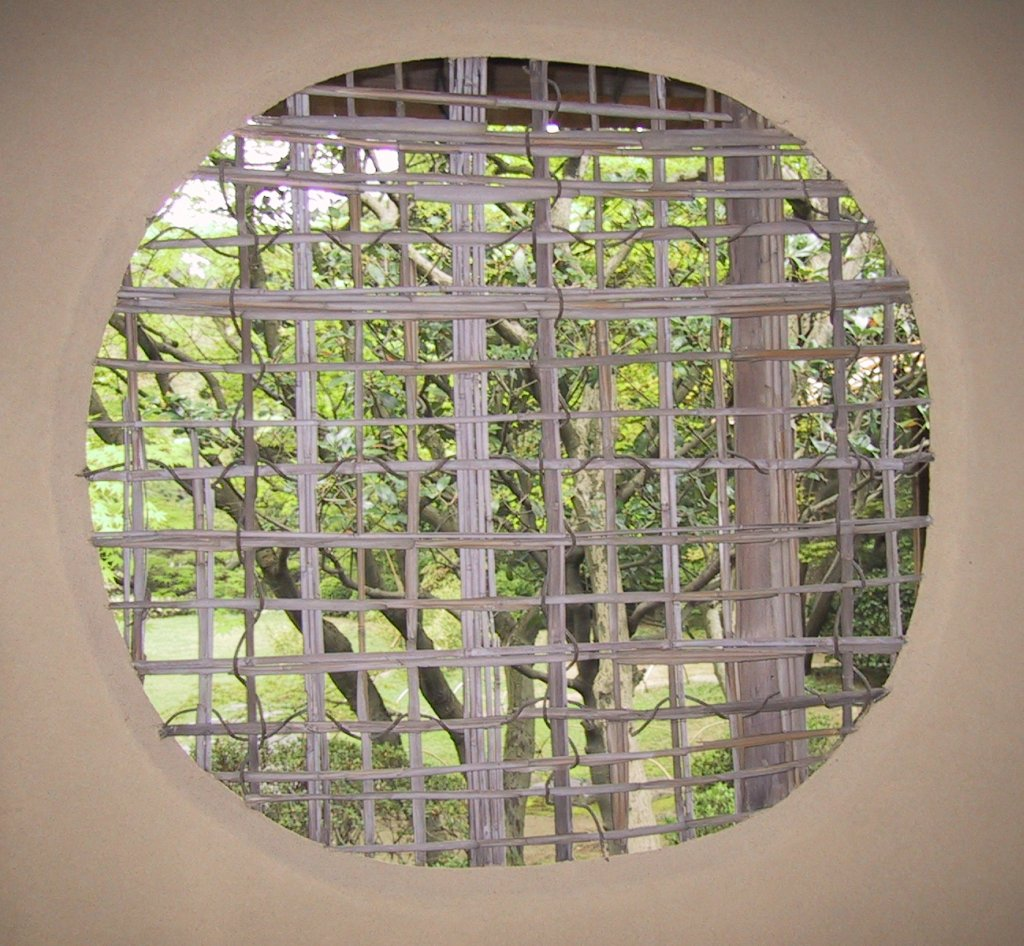
Latticed bamboo window

Jo-an is approached through the roji ('dewy ground') garden. It consists of a chashitsu (tea room), a three tatami mat mizuya (preparation room), and a one-and-a-half tatami mat rōka no ma (corridor room). The chashitsu is composed of two and a half tatami mats, a daime (three quarter tatami mat), and a toko. The building has a shake roof and a nijiriguchi ('crawling-in entrance').

== See also ==
- Japanese tea ceremony
- List of National Treasures of Japan (residences)
