= Sanbō-in =

Buddhist temple in Kyoto, Japan

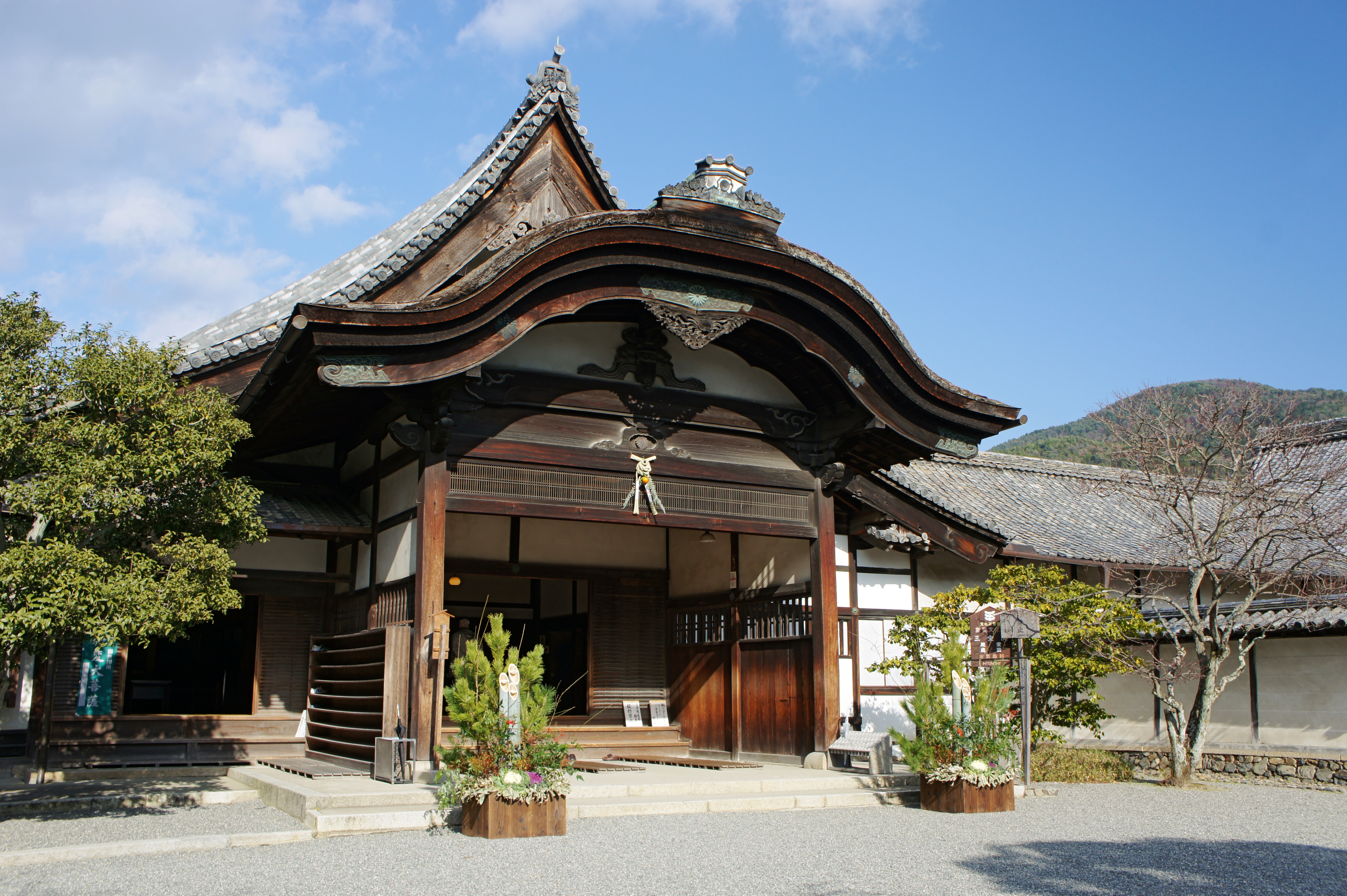
Daigenkan

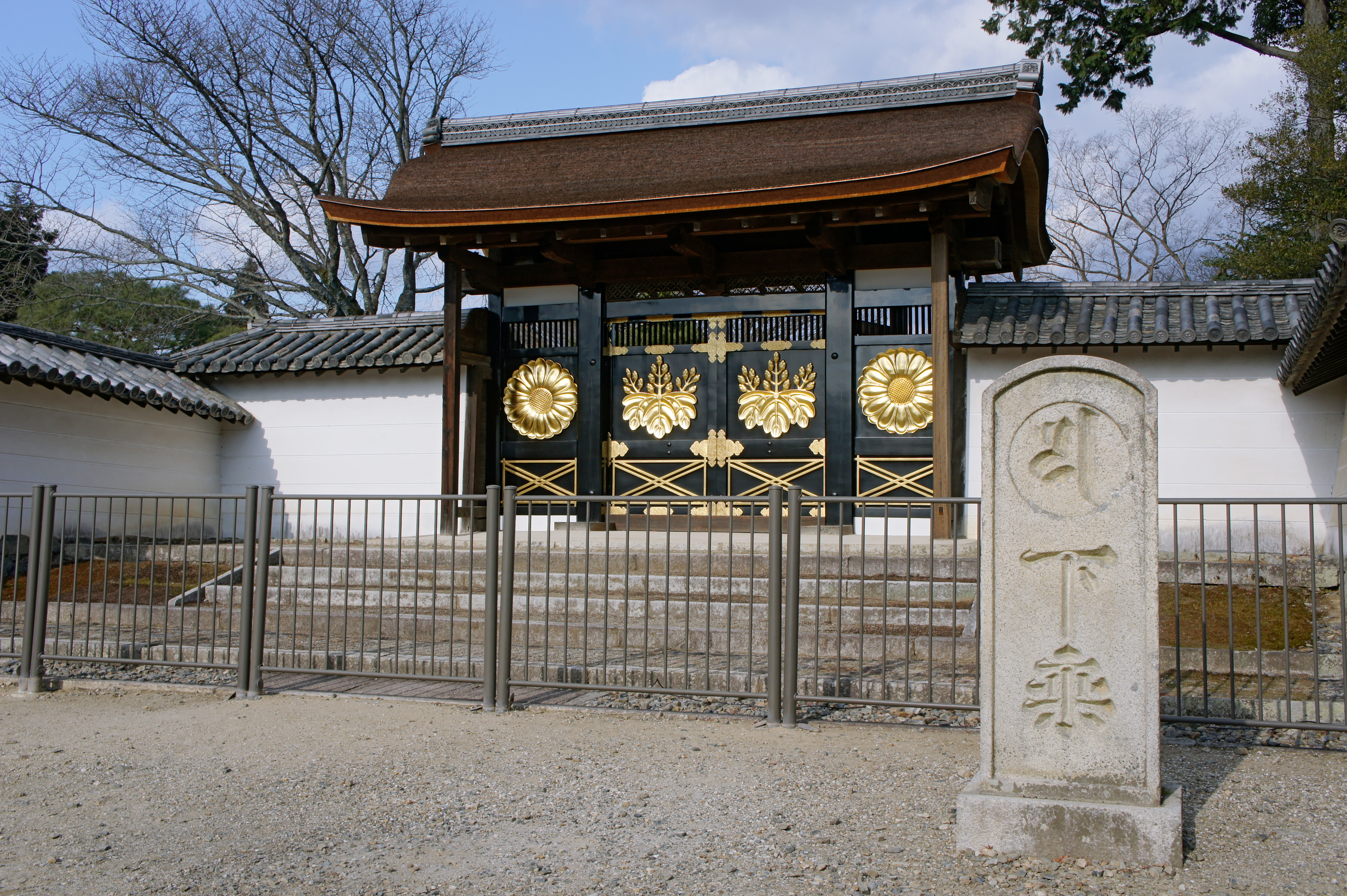
Karamon (National Treasures of Japan)

Sanbō-in (三宝院, Sanbō-in) is a Buddhist temple in southern Kyoto, Japan, known today primarily for the quality of its garden.

== History ==
Sanbō-in was established in the Azuchi-Momoyama period (1582–1615). It was a sub-temple of Daigo-ji, which is a Heian period temple founded in 902. The temple complex had fallen into disrepair during the Sengoku period.

A majority of the present buildings and the garden of Sanbō-in date from the late 16th century. The garden is designed as a stroll garden with a large pond and several paths and bridges. The garden is said to contain over 700 stones; and one of them, called the Fujito stone, is said to have cost over 5,000 bushels of rice. Sanbō-in is also a noteworthy illustration of a landscape garden which is designed for viewing from a specific perspective within a building. As laid out in the Momoyama period, the garden remains one of the finest uses of the "fortuitous crane," the "tortoise" and the "isle of eternal youth." These poetic terms identify specific ways in which stones and ponds are poised in a prescribed, esoteric relationship.

In 1598, Toyotomi Hideyoshi helped redesign the garden before his famous cherry blossom-viewing party. The karamon was either transferred from Fushimi castle or built there at the same time, and the main drawing room (表書院 omote shoin), another National Treasure, was finished shortly before Hideyoshi's death in September of that year. Hideyoshi's envisioned garden was completed in 1618, and Yoshiro, the chief gardener, received the title of "Kentei" (Excellent Gardener) for his work.

== See also ==
- List of Special Places of Scenic Beauty, Special Historic Sites and Special Natural Monuments
- List of Buddhist temples in Kyoto
- List of National Treasures of Japan (residences)

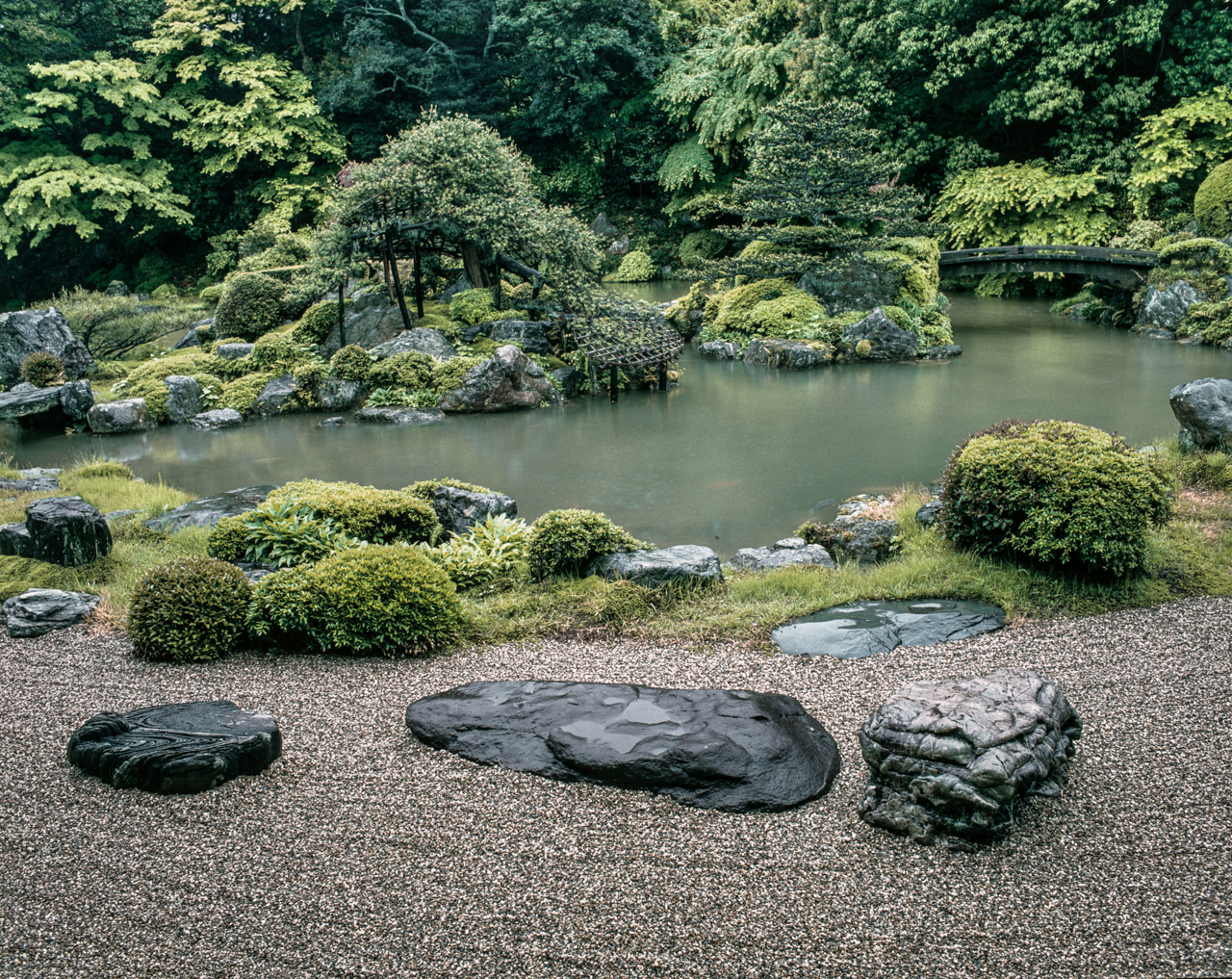
Temple garden
