= Shoin =

Audience hall in Japanese architecture

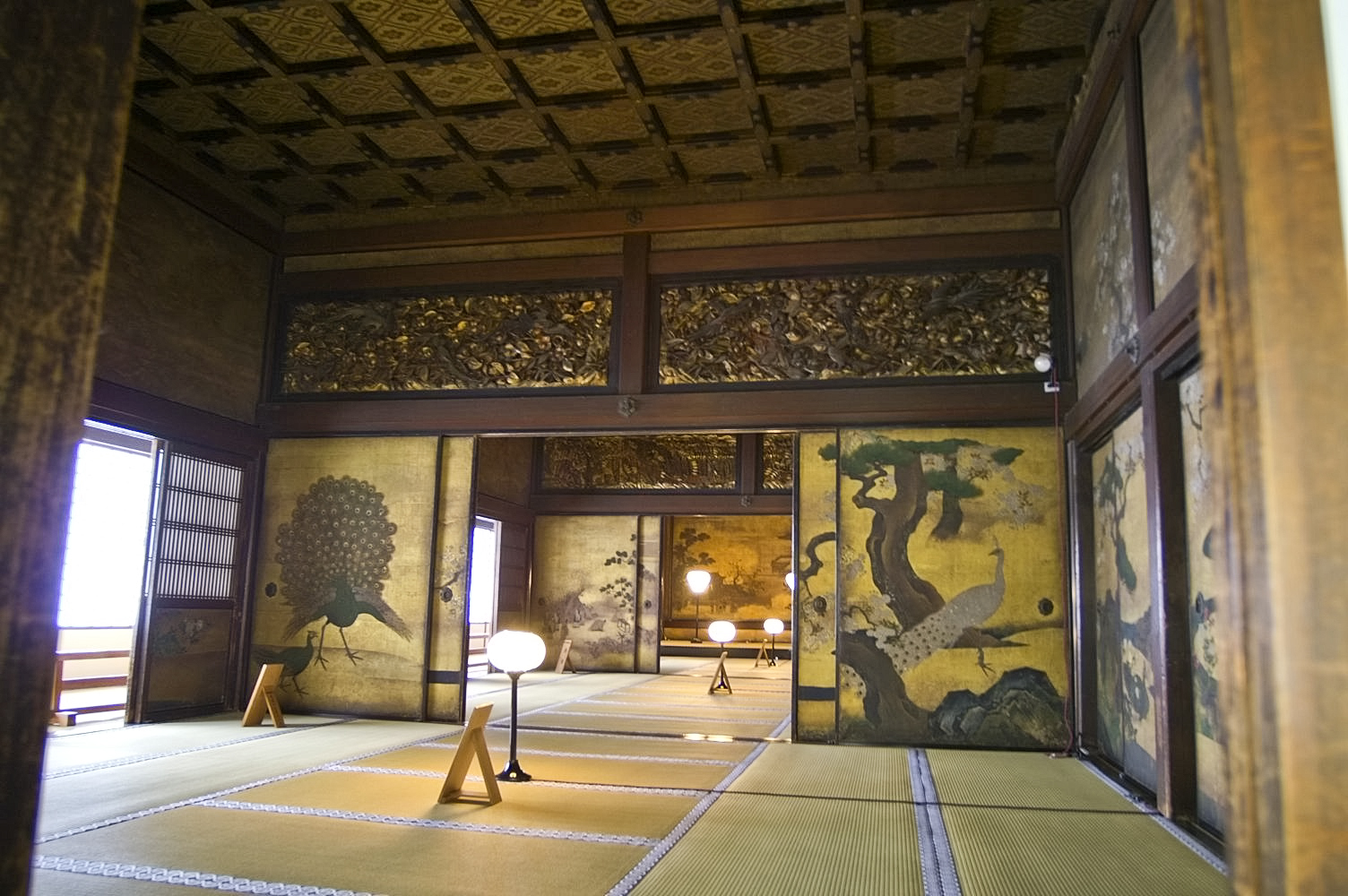
The Shiro-shoin at Hongan-ji

As life styles change, so does architecture. In few other ways can we see so directly and concretely the changes in the social and cultural life of the Muromachi elite as in the development of shoin-style architecture and the invention of the new form of domestic structure known as the kaisho.

— Ito Teiji,

Shoin (書院, drawing room or study) is a type of audience hall in Japanese architecture that was developed during the Muromachi period. The term originally meant a study and a place for lectures on the sūtra within a temple, but later it came to mean just a drawing room or study. The shoin-zukuri style takes its name from this room. In a shoin-zukuri building, the shoin is the zashiki, a tatami-room dedicated to the reception of guests.

The emerging architecture of the Muromachi period was subsequently influenced by the increasing use of shoin. One of the most noticeable changes in architecture to arise from the shoin came from the practice of lining their floors with tatami mats. Since tatami mats have a standardized size, the floor plans for shoin rooms had to be developed around the proportions of the tatami mat; this in turn affected the proportions of doors, the height of rooms, and other aspects of the structure. Before the shoin popularized the practice of lining floors with tatami mats it had been standard to bring out only a single tatami mat for the highest-ranking person in the room to sit on.

The architecture surrounding and influenced by the shoin quickly developed many other distinguishing features. Since the guests sat on the floor instead of on furniture, they were positioned at a lower vantage point than their Chinese counterparts who were accustomed to using furniture. This lower vantage point generated such developments as the suspended ceilings which functioned to make the room feel less expansive, and also meant that the ceiling's rafters were no longer visible as they were in China. The new suspended ceilings also allowed for more elaborate decoration, resulting in many highly ornate suspended ceilings in addition to the much simpler ones. Other characteristic developments to arise from the lower vantage point were the tokonoma and chigaidana. The tokonoma was an elevated recess built into the wall to create a space for displaying Chinese art, which was popular at the time, at a comfortable eye level. The chigaidana, or "staggered shelves", were shelving structures built into the tokonoma to display smaller objects. At the same time as the development of the shoin architecture, fusuma, or "sliding doors", came to be a popular way to divide rooms. To accommodate the sliding doors, builders began creating square-shaped columns.

The asymmetry of the tokonoma and chigaidana pair, along with the squared pillars, differentiated the shoin design from the Chinese design of the time, which favored symmetric pairs of furniture and round pillars. Soon after its advent, shoin architecture became associated with these evolving elements as it became the predominant format for formal gathering rooms.
