= Shoin-zukuri =

Style of Japanese architecture

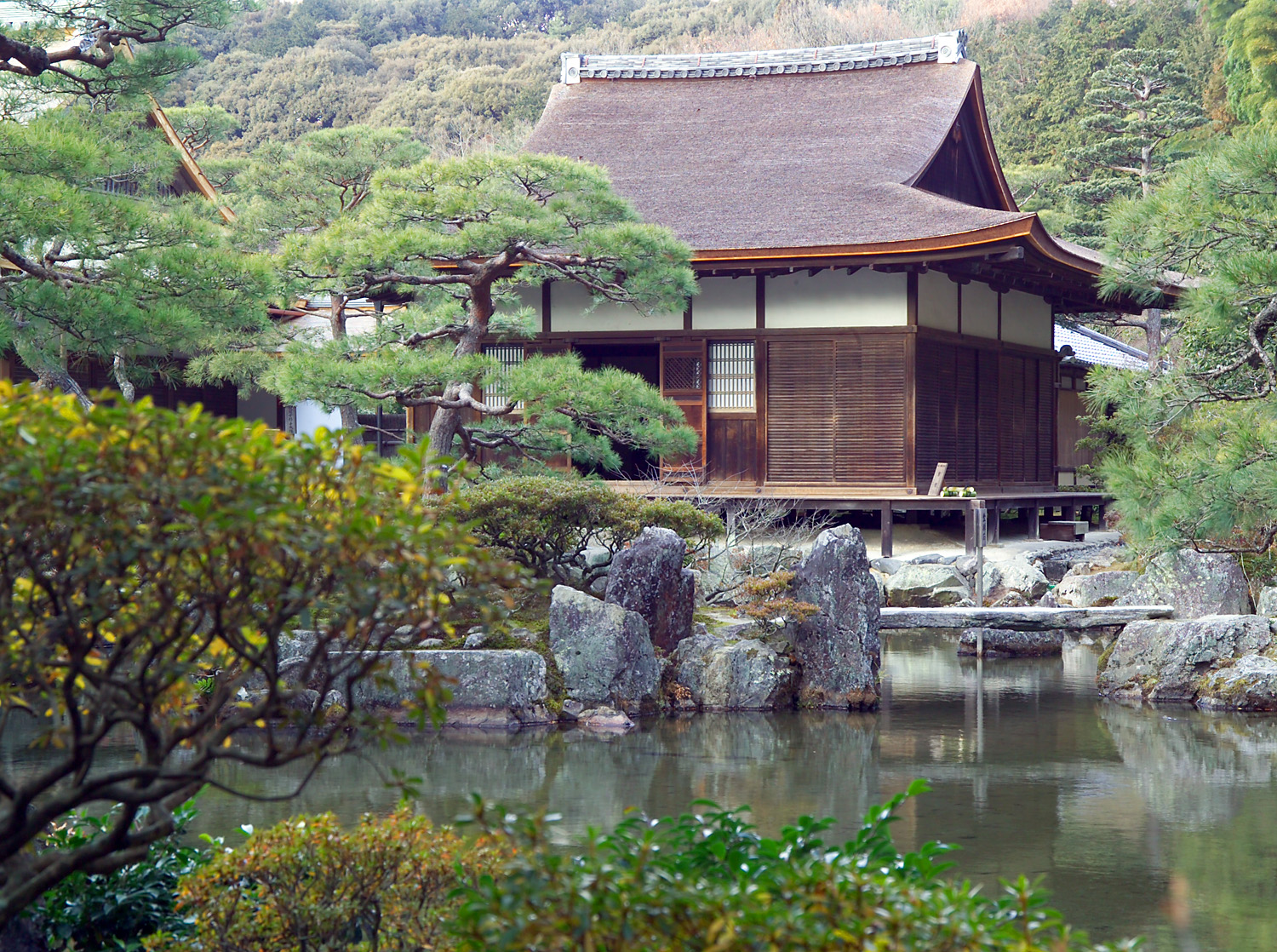
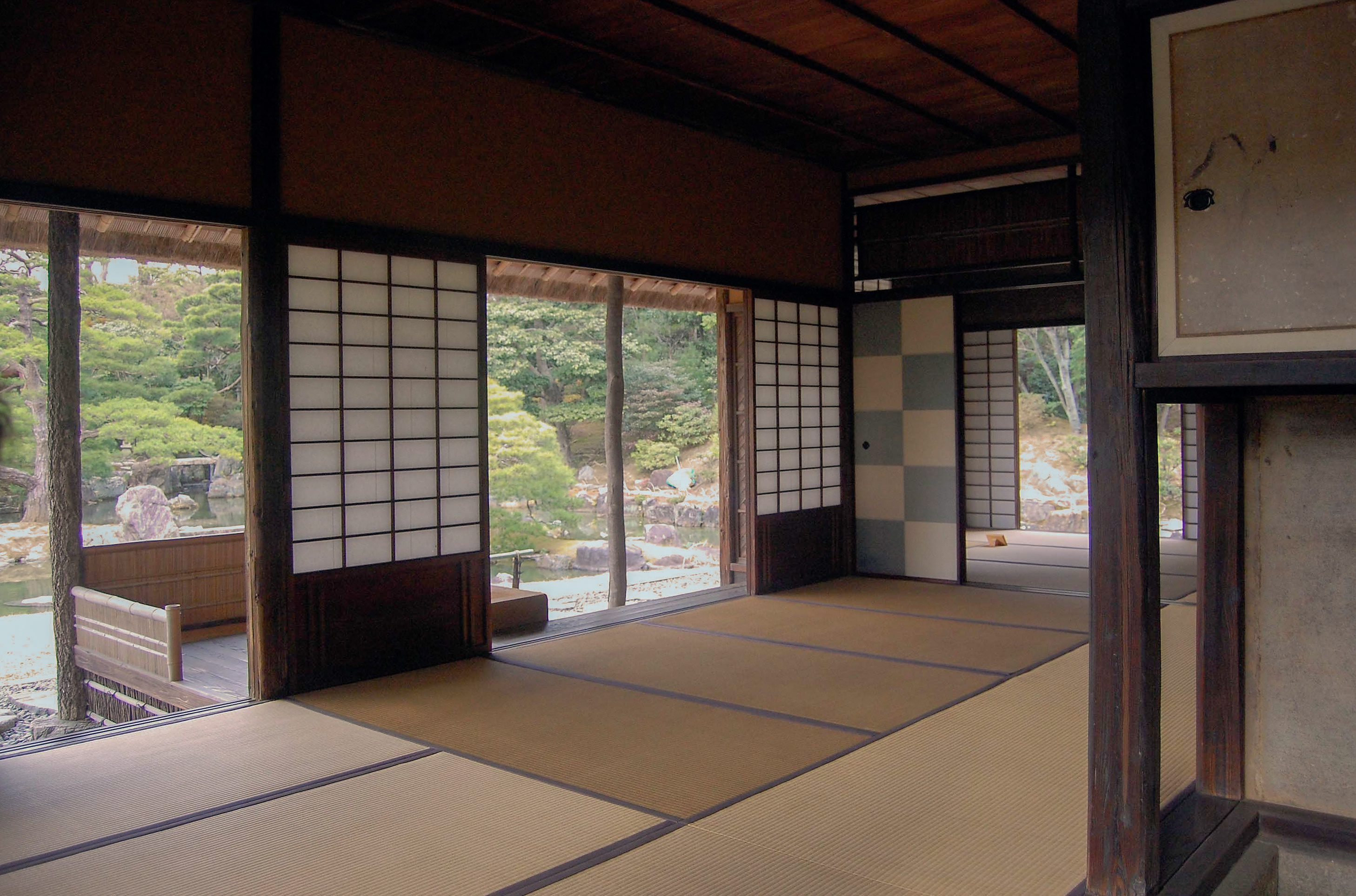
- From top to bottom: Tōgu-dō at Ginkaku-ji, inside Shokin-tei at Katsura Imperial Villa
- Years active: 14th century–19th century
- Location: Japan
- Influences: Shinden-zukuri

Shoin-zukuri (Japanese: 書院造; 'study room architecture') is a style of Japanese architecture developed in the Muromachi, Azuchi–Momoyama and Edo periods that forms the basis of today's traditional-style Japanese houses. Characteristics of the shoin-zukuri development were the incorporation of square posts and washitsu floors, i.e. those completely covered with tatami. The style takes its name from the shoin, a term that originally meant a study and a place for lectures on sutras in a temple, but which later came to mean just a drawing room or study.

== History ==
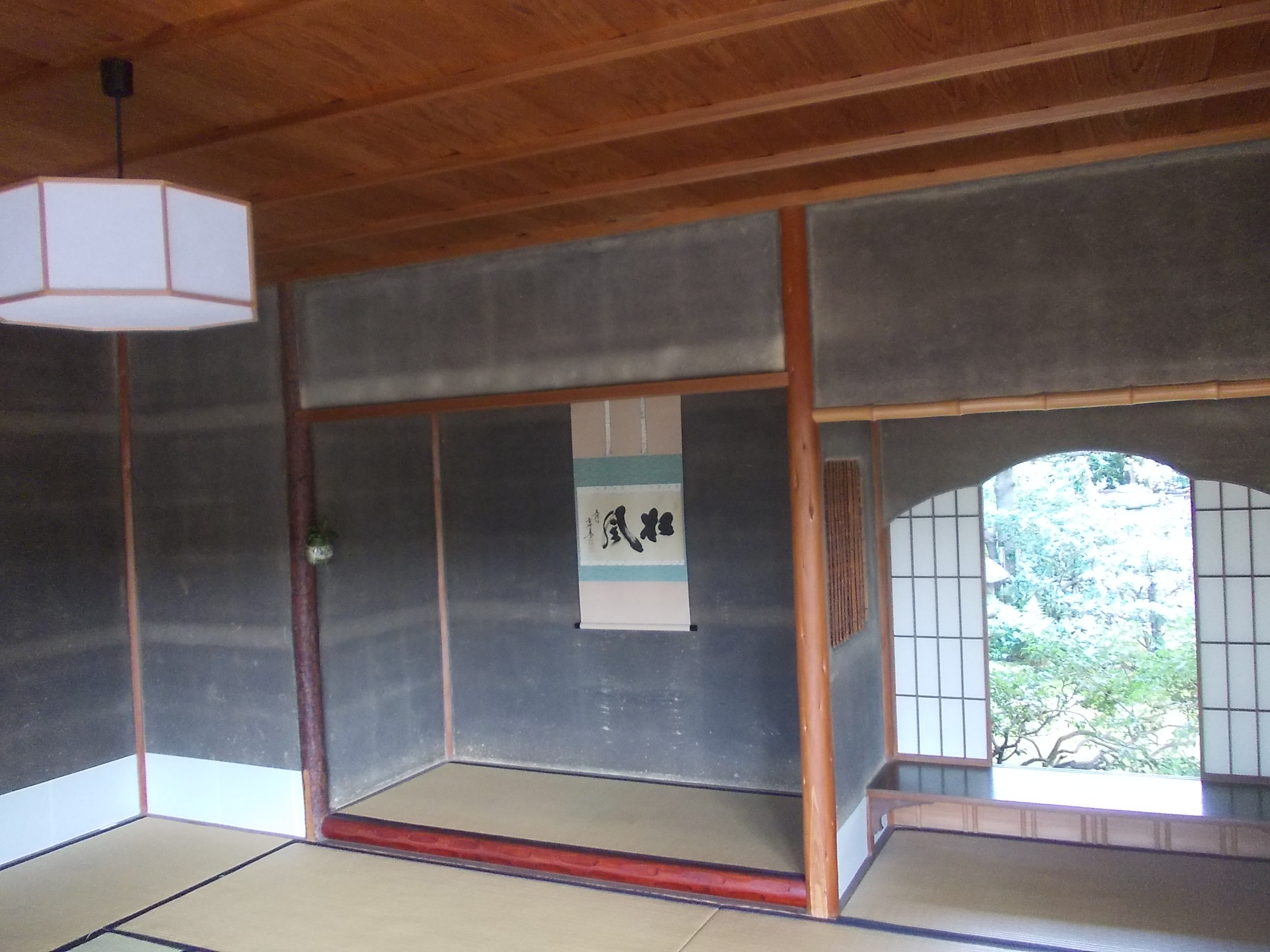
Tokonoma with scroll, and tsuke-shoin, a writing desk with a view, which gave this style its name; this later became purely decorative, being used to display impressive writing utensils

The foundations for the design of today's traditional Japanese residential houses with tatami floors were established in the late Muromachi period (approximately 1338 to 1573) and refined during the ensuing Momoyama period. Shoin-zukuri, a new architectural style influenced by Zen Buddhism, developed during that time from the shinden-zukuri of the earlier Heian period's palaces and the subsequent residential style favored by the warrior class during the Kamakura period. The term shoin (書院), meaning study or drawing room has been used to denote reception rooms in residences of the military elite as well as study rooms at monasteries. A shoin has a core area surrounded by aisles and smaller areas separated by fusuma sliding doors, or shōji partitions constructed of paper on a wooden frame or wooden equivalents, mairado (舞良戸) and sugido (杉戸).

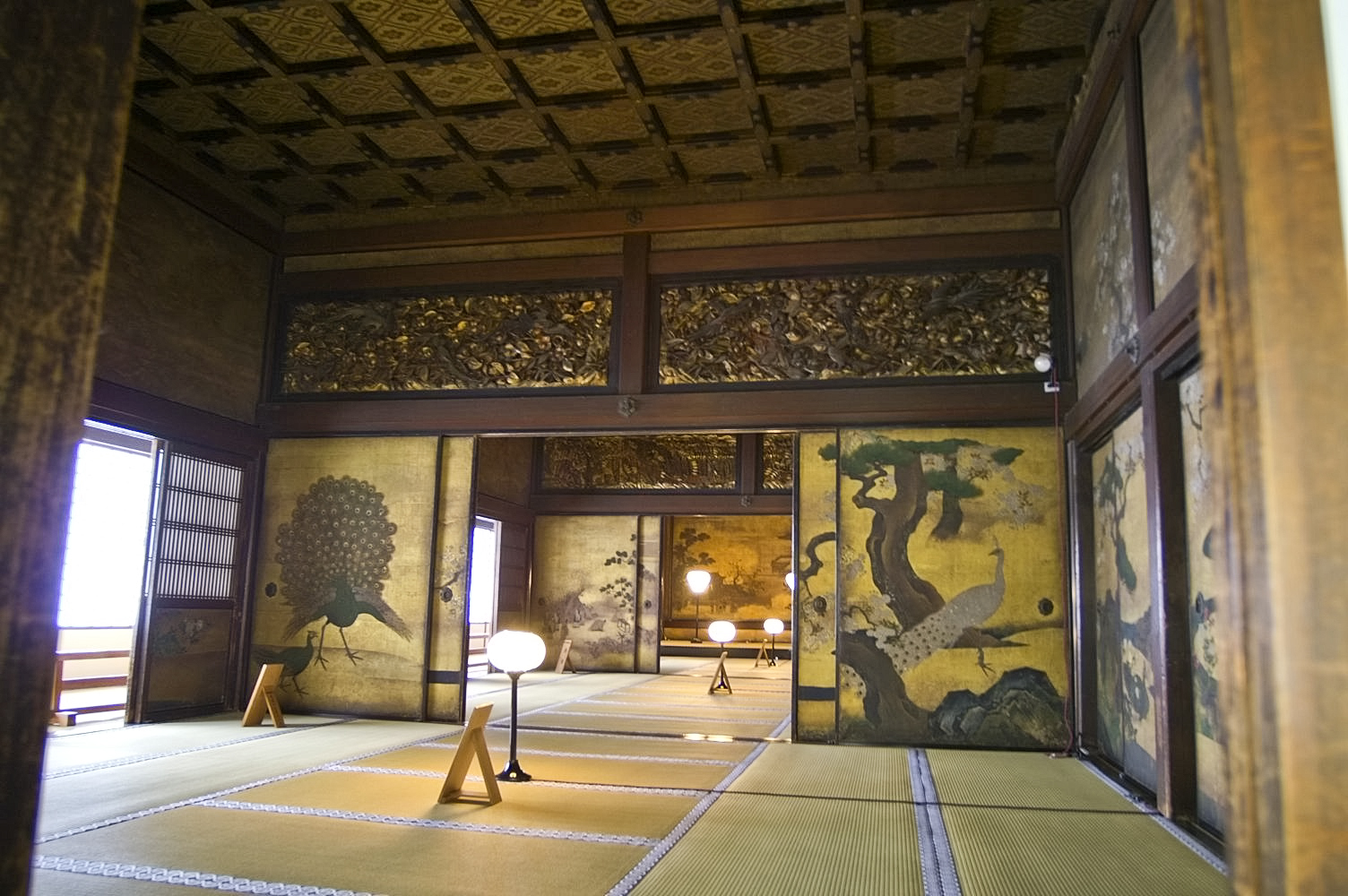
The shiro-shoin at Nishi Hongan-ji

The main reception room is characterized by specific features: a recessed alcove (tokonoma), staggered shelves, built-in desks, and ornate sliding doors. Generally the reception room is covered with wall-to-wall tatami and has square beveled pillars, a coved or coffered ceiling, and wooden shutters to protect the area from rain (雨戸, amado). The entrance hall (genkan) emerged as an element of residential architecture during the Momoyama period. The oldest extant shoin style building is the Tōgu-dō at Ginkaku-ji dating from 1485. Other representative examples of early shoin style, also called shuden, include two guest halls at Mii-dera. In the early Edo period, shoin-zukuri reached its peak and spread beyond the residences of the military elite. The more formal shoin-style of this period is apparent in the characteristics of Ninomaru Palace at Nijō Castle as well as the shoin at Nishi Hongan-ji (see photos above).

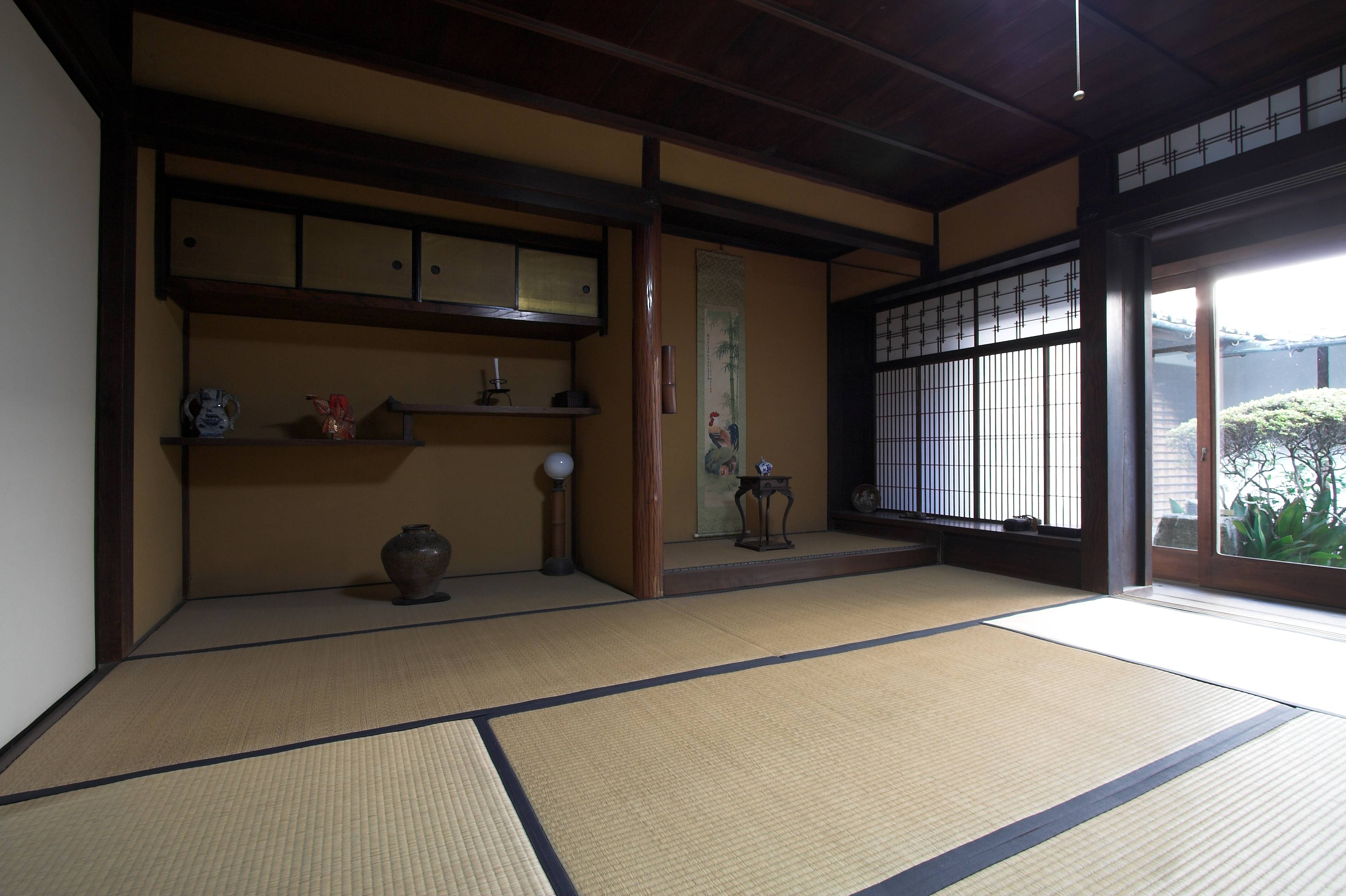
Here, the tsuke-shoin has been reduced to a windowledge used as a display shelf.

Conrad Totman argues that the development of the shoin-zukuri style was linked to a scarcity of wood caused by excessive deforestation, which prompted the use of lower-quality, more abundant material. As larger, straight-grained trees became less available, "elegant wooden flooring gave way to crude wooden under-flooring that was concealed beneath tatami." Likewise, sliding wooden doors were replaced with fusuma, a lightweight combination of "stiff fabric or cardboard-like material pasted onto a frame made of slender wooden sticks," and shōji sliding panels served as a substitute for more elaborate paneled wooden doors.

The simpler style used in the architecture of tea houses for the tea ceremony developed in parallel with shoin-zukuri. In the 16th century Sen no Rikyū established dedicated "grass hut" (草庵, sōan) style teahouses characterized by their small size of typically two to eight tatami, the use of natural materials, and rustic appearance. This teahouse style, exemplified by the Joan and Taian teahouses, was influenced by Japanese farmhouse style and the shoin style featuring tatami matted floors, recessed alcoves (tokonoma) and one or more ante chambers for preparations.

=== Sukiya-zukuri ===
By the beginning of the Edo period, the features of the shoin and teahouse styles began to blend. The result was an informal version of the shoin style called sukiya-zukuri (数寄屋造). The sukiya-zukuri style has a characteristic decorative alcove and shelf, and utilizes woods such as cedar, pine, hemlock, bamboo, and cypress, often with rough surfaces including the bark. Compared to those in the shoin style, roof eaves in the sukiya style bend downward. While the shoin style was suitable for ceremonial architecture, it became too imposing for residential buildings. Consequently, the less formal sukiya style was used for mansions for the aristocracy and samurai after the beginning of the Edo period.

== See also ==
- List of National Treasures of Japan (residences)
- List of architectural styles
