= Mizuya =

Preparation area for Japanese tea

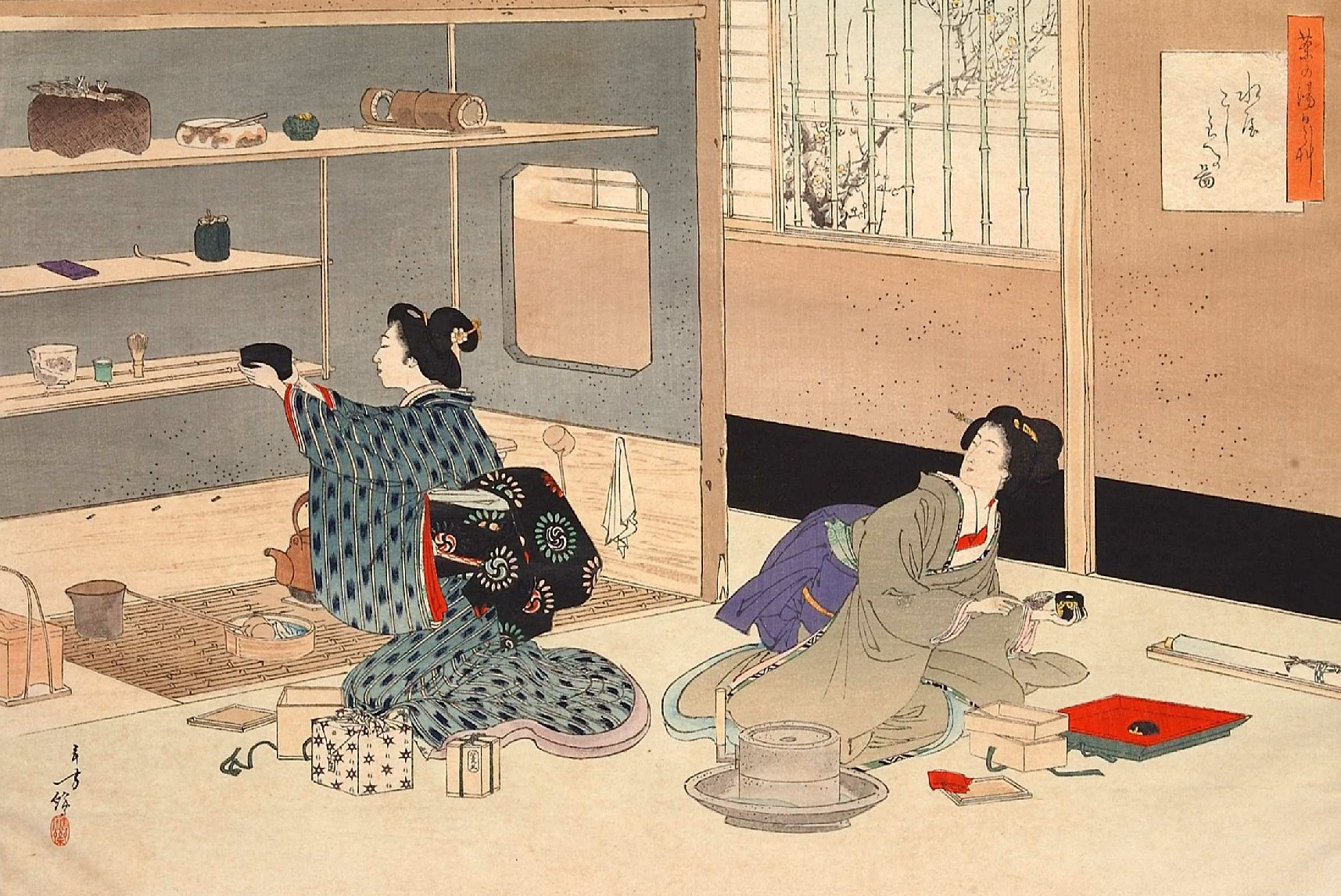
Preparing the washing area in a tea ceremony room, woodblock by Toshikata Mizuno, 1896

Mizuya (水屋; "water room") is the term for the preparation area in a Japanese tea house (chashitsu) or attached to any venue used for the Japanese tea ceremony. For instance, the area used for preparation during outdoor tea ceremonies is also called the mizuya. The term mizuya can also refer to purificatory fonts at shrines and temples, as well as to storage cupboards for use in kitchens. This article, however, focuses on the tea ceremony mizuya.

== History ==
The full development of chadō (the Japanese "Way of Tea") and advent of the independent structure dedicated to and designed for use for this cultural activity is generally attributed to the sixteenth century tea master Sen no Rikyū. With the development of a structure dedicated to receiving guests for this cultural activity, there naturally was the need for a "back room" area for the host to make ready the items to be used for the reception of the guests. Before this, during the early development of the Japanese tea ceremony, corners of large reception rooms were partitioned off for tea-making, and there was no specific area or space designed for the preparations. According to A. L. Sadler, the earliest extant example of a space attached to a chashitsu (room intended for the tea ceremony) that is describable as a mizuya exists at the Taian, a chashitsu designed by Sen no Rikyū. Mizuya are also mentioned in writings by Sen no Rikyū's chanoyu (tea ceremony) mentor, Takeno Jōō.

== Use ==
As its name suggests, a mizuya provides a location for the performing of tea ceremony–related tasks involving water, such as washing the various utensils and supplies, and boiling extra water for filling and replenishing the pot in the tea room. A mizuya is also used for the final preparation of wagashi that will be served during a chanoyu function (such as cutting them, arranging them on dishes, and so on); for organizing, preparing, and (in some cases) storing the tea supplies; and, in the case of functions for large groups of people, for quickly preparing many bowls of tea to serve to guests.

== Facilities ==
The most modest modern mizuya may comprise little more than a hot-plate or electric kettle and several buckets of fresh water, and might be located in a screened-off outdoor area with a grass floor. A fully equipped modern indoor mizuya may rival the best-equipped kitchen, with several sinks with hot and cold running water, an elaborate system of storage areas, cupboards, shelves and worktops, a refrigerator, stove, and microwave oven. In practice, however, most fall somewhere in between.

A typical indoor mizuya has in it a recess three or four feet wide and two feet deep, the mizuyanagashi, possibly with a tatami mat in front of it, equipped with a traditional sink, the nagashi (a long metal tub sunk into the floor and covered with a bamboo grate called sunoko), several wooden shelves for storing tea supplies, and a board with pegs for hanging ladles and towels. Where there is no permanent built-in mizuyanagashi with these facilities, a portable unit called an okimizuya may be used. There are manufacturers of such units. Whatever the style and size of this area, it will be kept scrupulously clean and organized, each school having its preferred order of arranging the utensils.

== The special mizuya dōko ==
Some tea rooms may have a special type of built-in recessed mizuya cabinet called mizuya dōko (水屋洞庫). It is built into the wall of the tea room, at floor level, on the side where the host's mat is situated, and has sliding doors so that it can be closed from view of the guests. A plain dōko lacks the water drainage facility that a mizuya dōko features, and therefore functions differently from a mizuya dōko. Both dōko and mizuya dōko are innovations meant for the use of hosts who have difficulty walking and getting up and down from the seiza sitting position, such as the elderly in particular.

According to A. L. Sadler, the name dōko is taken from the boxes in which strolling puppeteers kept their dolls, and was first borrowed by Sen no Rikyū. Dōko were first placed on the floor, then hung on the wall, and finally built in.
