= Karamon =

Type of gate found in Japanese architecture

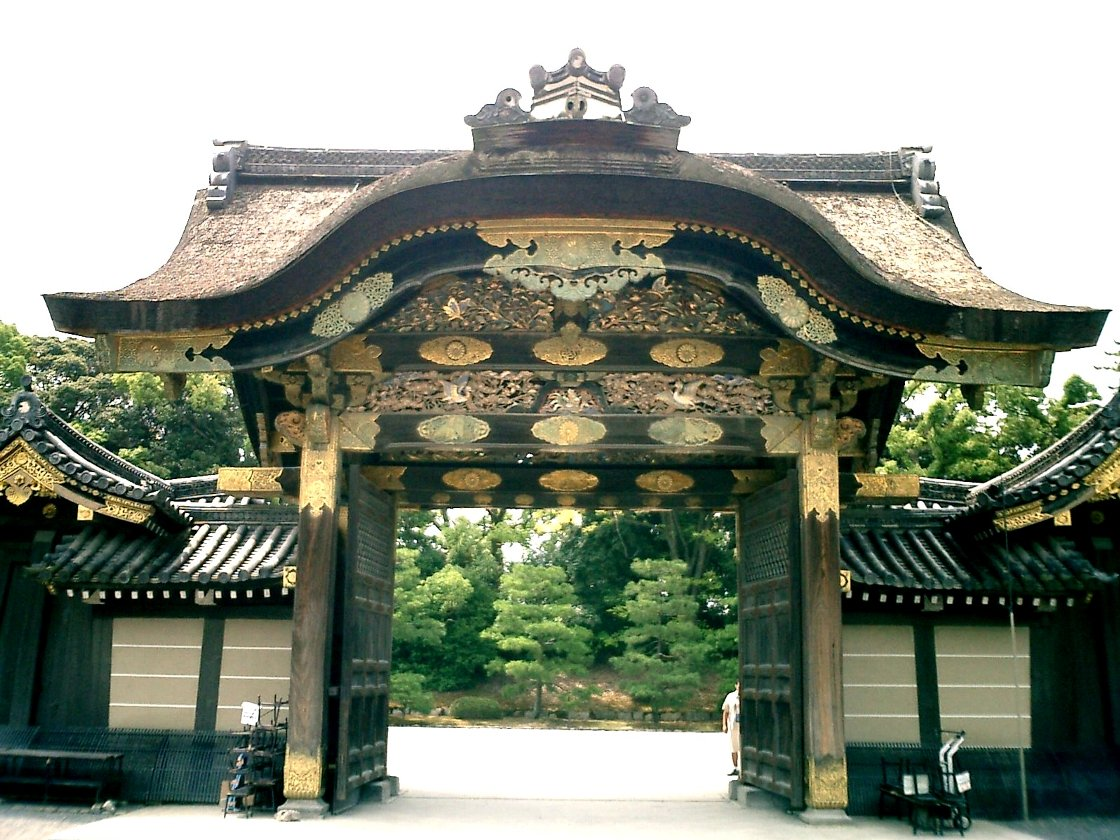
A kara-mon at Nijō Castle

The kara-mon or kara-kado (唐門) is a type of gate seen in Japanese architecture. It is characterized by the usage of kara-hafu, an undulating bargeboard peculiar to Japan. Kara-mon are often used at the entrances of Japanese castles, Buddhist temples and Shinto shrines, and have historically been a symbol of authority.

== History ==
Although kara (唐) can be translated as meaning "China" or "Tang", this type of roof with undulating bargeboards first appeared in Japan during the late Heian period. It was named thus because the word kara was associated by the Japanese with any type of ornate architecture regardless of origin. The karahafu developed during the Heian period and is shown in picture scrolls to decorate gates, corridors, and palanquins. The oldest existing karahafu is found at Hōryū-ji temple.

Initially, the kara-hafu was used only in temples and aristocratic gateways, but starting from the beginning of the Azuchi–Momoyama period, it became an important architectural element in the construction of a daimyō's mansions and castles. The kara-mon entrance was reserved for the shōgun during his onari visits to the retainer, or for the reception of the emperor at shogunate establishments. A structure associated with these social connections naturally imparted special meaning.

Kara-mon would later become a means to proclaim the prestige of a building and functioned as a symbol of both religious and secular architecture. In the Tokugawa shogunate, the kara-mon gates were a powerful symbol of authority reflected in architecture.

== Variations ==
=== Mukai-kara-mon ===
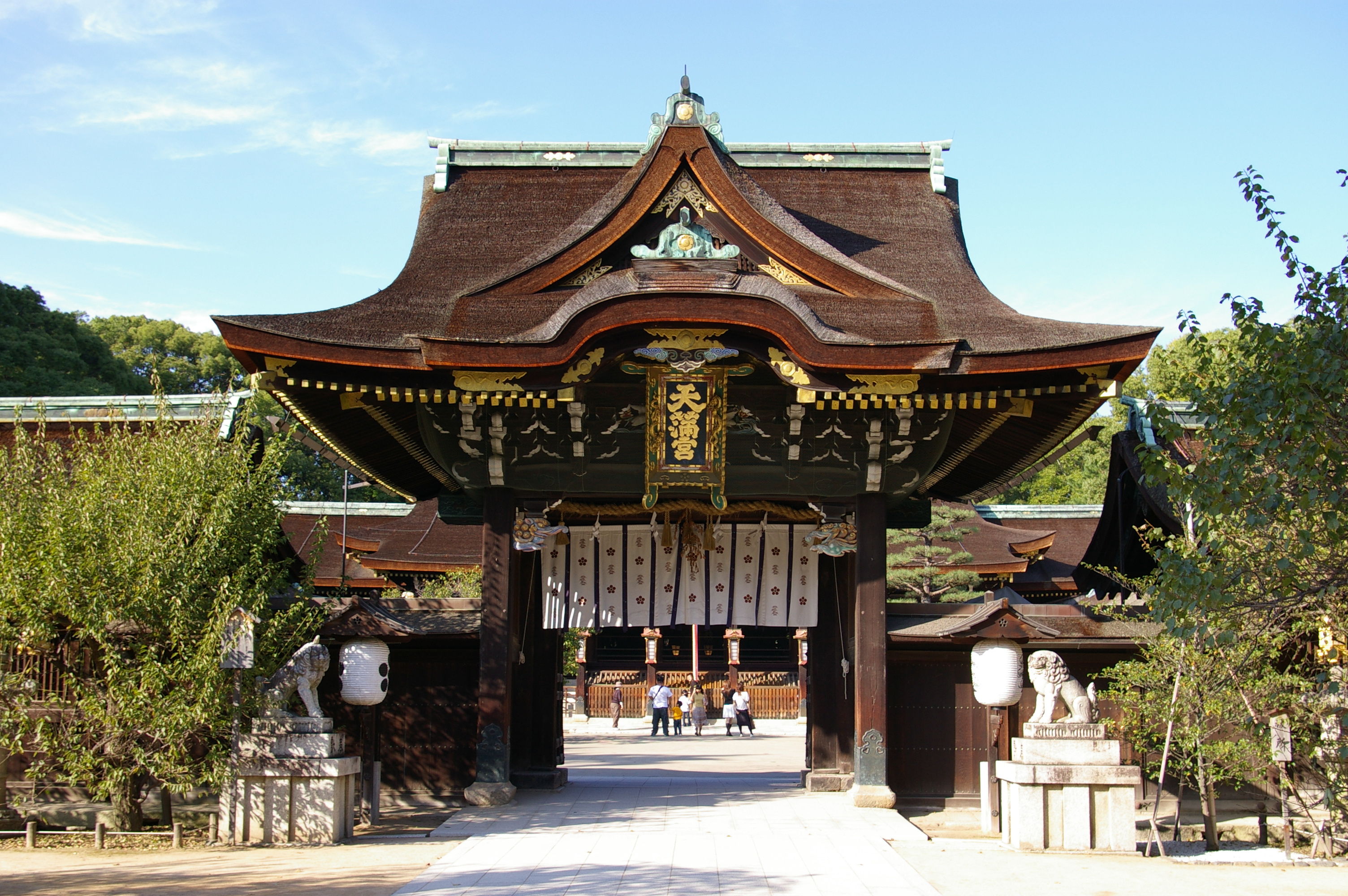
A Mukai-kara-mon at Kitano Tenman-gū

Mukai-kara-mon (向唐門) is the most common form of kara-mon, and features two kara-hafu at the front and back of the gate. This type of gate may incorporate a kara-hafu in the middle of the roof, or the entire gable itself may be a curved structure.

=== Hira-kara-mon ===
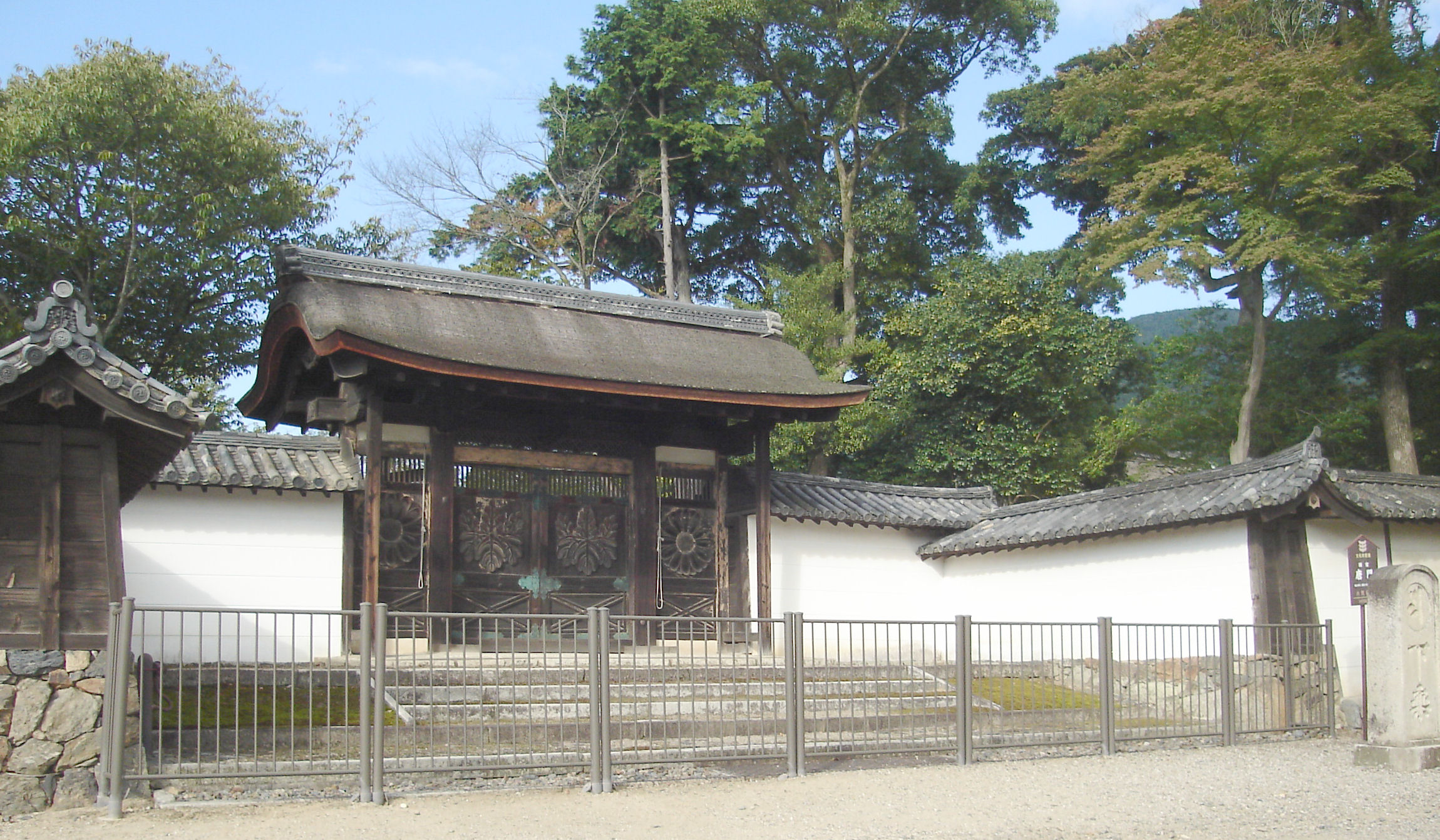
A hira-kara-mon at Daigo-ji

Hira-kara-mon (平唐門) are distinguished with two kara-hafu on the left and right sides of the gate. This type of gate was originally used at palaces, and was once called miyuki-mon (御幸門).

=== Kara-yotsu-ashi-mon ===
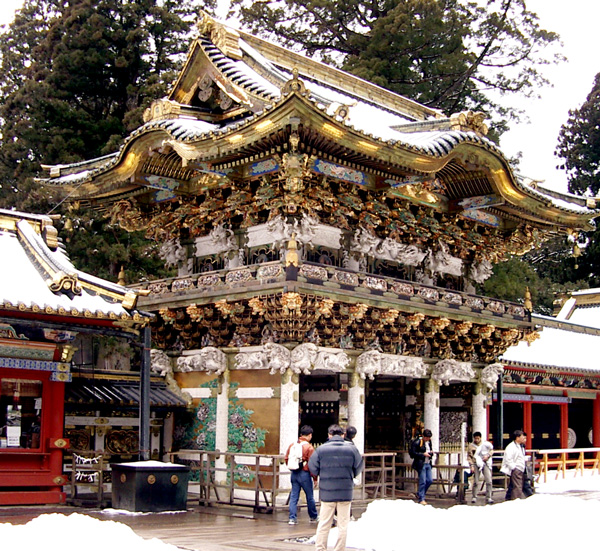
Yōmeimon, a kara-yotsu-ashi-mon at Nikkō Tōshō-gū

Kara-yotsu-ashi-mon (唐四脚門, "Four-legged gate") is an ornate style of kara-mon that features four undulating gables on all sides of the gate. A good example of this type of gate can be found at Nikkō Tōshō-gū. This kara-mon is decorated with 611 sculptures, including the Seven Lucky Gods and the Eight Immortals.

== See also ==
- Mon (architecture)
- Japanese Buddhist architecture
- Buddhist temples in Japan
- List of National Treasures of Japan (temples)
