= Tokonoma =

Alcove in Japanese reception rooms

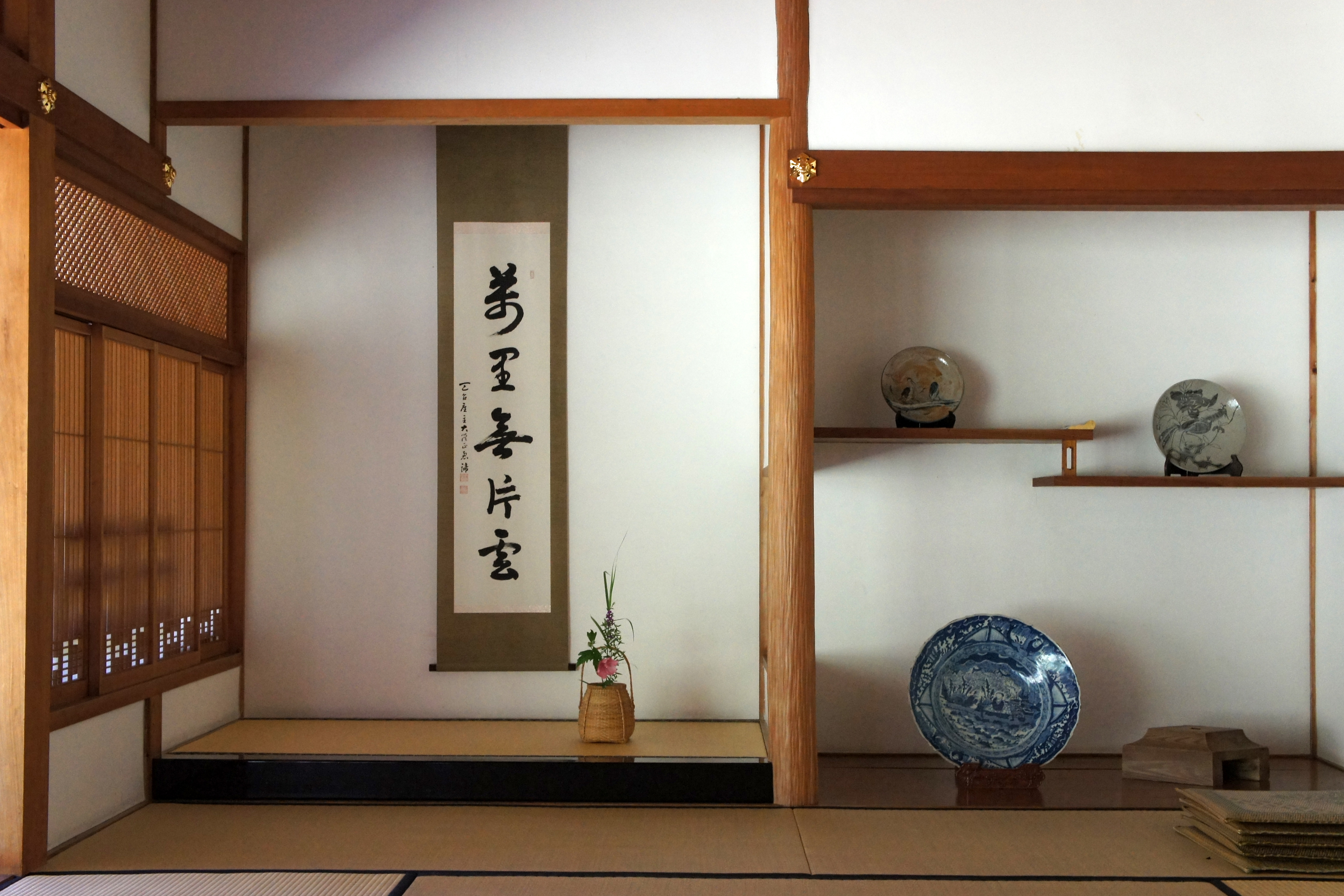
A tokonoma with a kakemono and ikebana flower arrangement

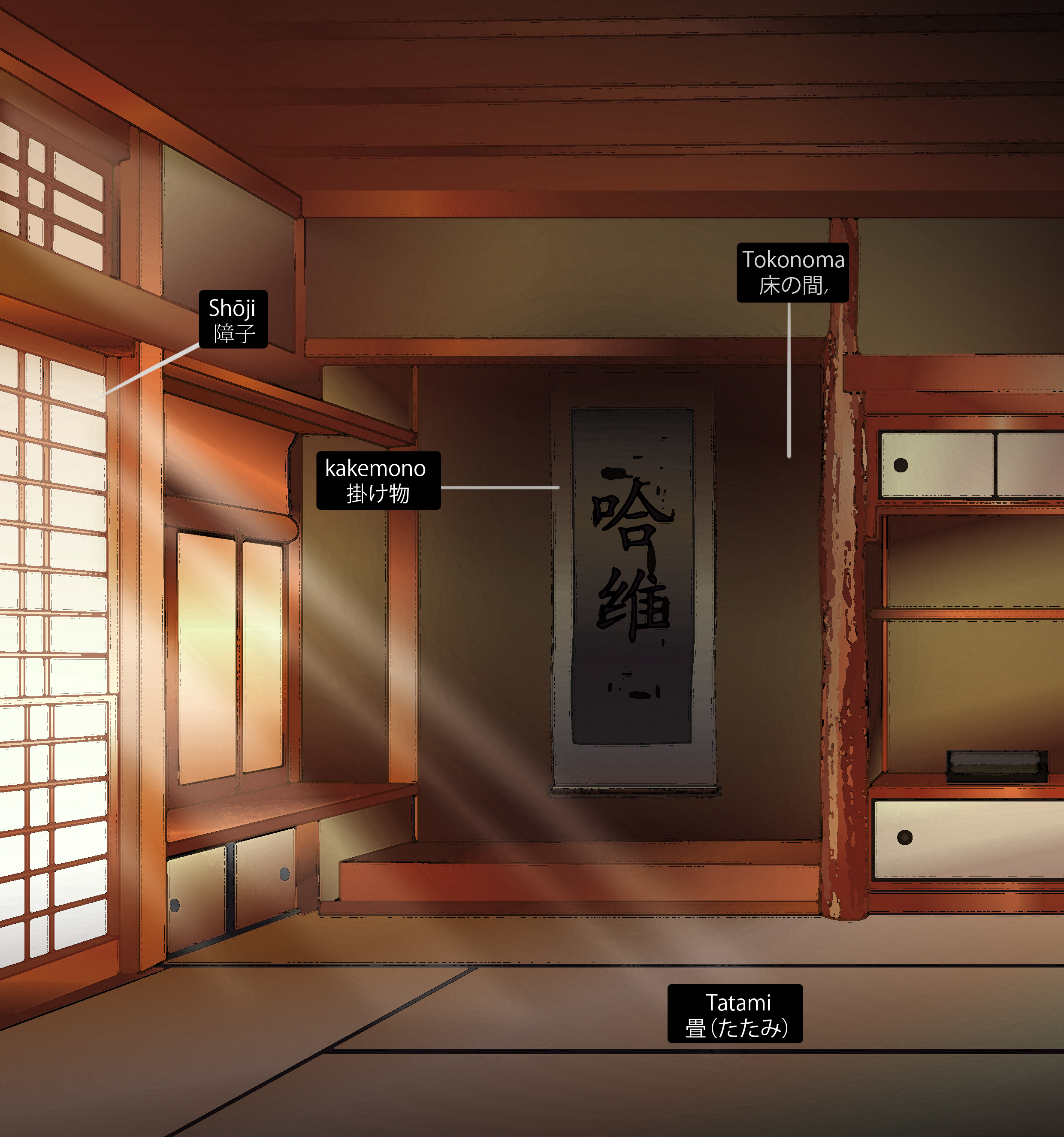
Detailed view of a tokonoma and aspects of a Japanese room

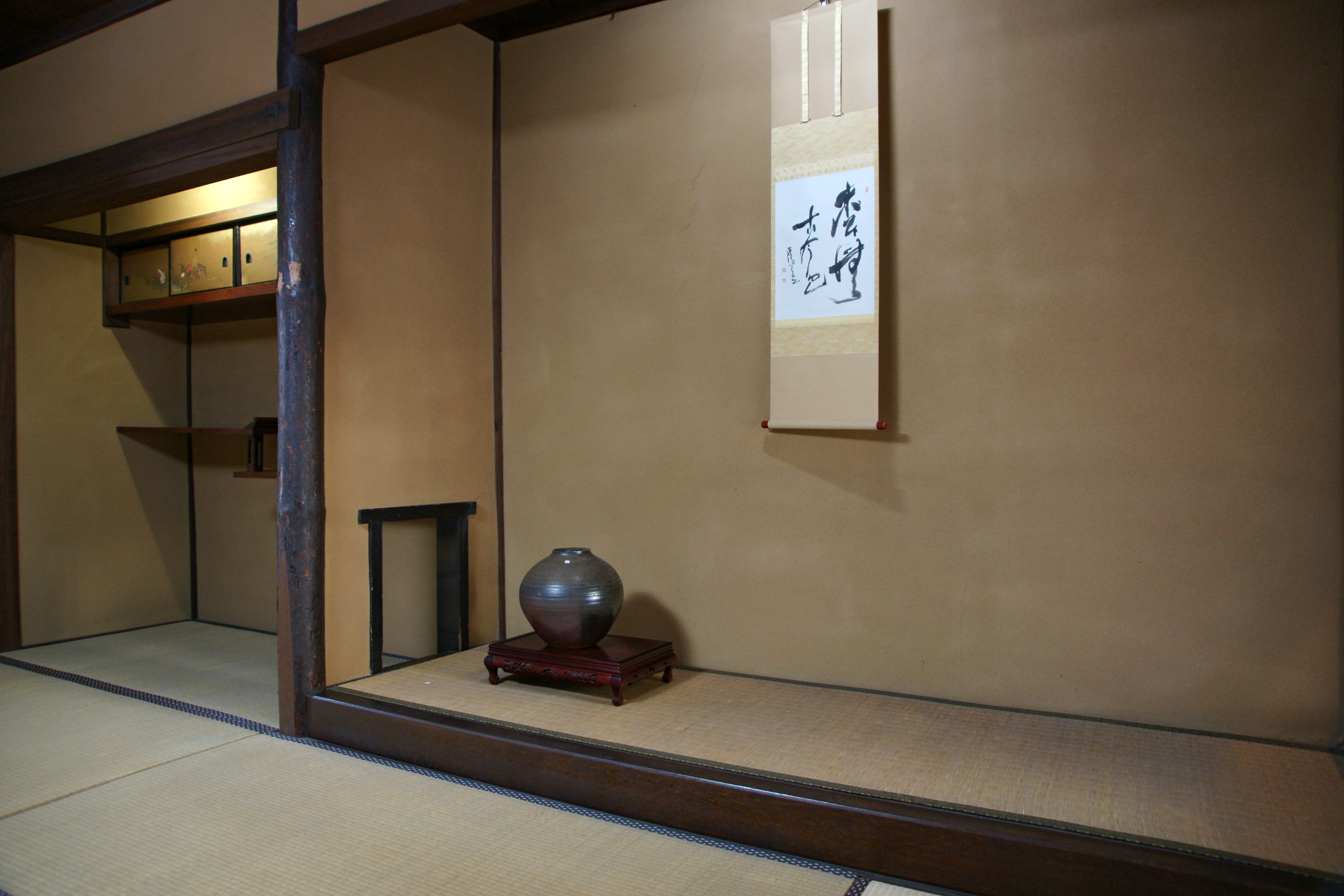
View from the side of a tokonoma

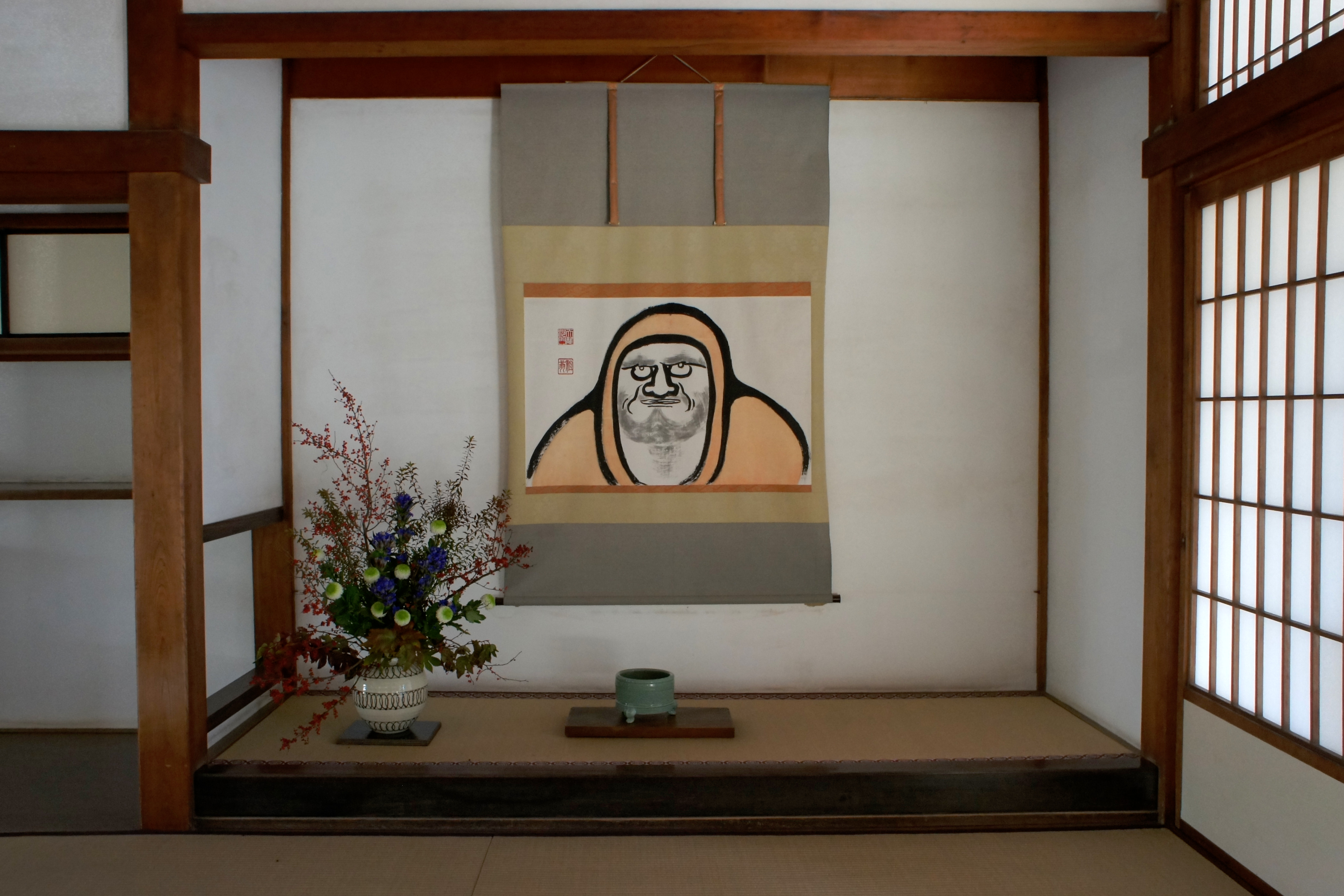
Tokonoma at Tenryū-ji

A tokonoma (床の間), or simply toko (床), is a recessed space in a Japanese-style reception room, in which items for artistic appreciation are displayed. In English, a tokonoma could be called an alcove.

== History ==
There are two theories about the predecessor of tokonoma: the first is that it derives from the room structure of the shinden-zukuri, which flourished in the Heian period (794–1185) and declined in the Muromachi period (1336–1573); the second is that it derives from the room structure of Zen monasteries in the Kamakura period (1185–1333). In the room of the monastery, there was a board called oshiita (押板) which displayed Buddhist altar fittings such as candlesticks, incense burners and vases. On the wall behind oshiita was a hanging scroll with a Buddhist theme. According to this theory, the oshiita and the back wall developed into a shoin-zukuri-style tokonoma in the Muromachi period.

In shoin-zukuri, an architectural style developed in the Muromachi period, tokonoma came to be used as room decoration, and the owner of the house sat in front of tokonoma decorated with various things to meet guests. However, in the case of important guests, the householder, in deference to them, had them sit in front of the tokonoma.

== Characteristics ==
The items typically displayed in a tokonoma are calligraphic or pictorial scrolls and an ikebana flower arrangement. Bonsai and okimono are also common—although traditionally, bonsai were not considered worthy for a place of such respect. The tokonoma and its contents are essential elements of traditional Japanese interior decoration. The kanji toko (床) literally means "floor" or "bed"; ma (間) means "space" or "room".

When seating guests in a Japanese-style room, the correct etiquette is to seat the most important guest closest to the tokonoma as this is in the location furthest from the entrance, a location called the kamiza. Stepping within it is strictly forbidden, except to change the display, when a strict etiquette must be followed.

The pillar on one side of the tokonoma, called toko-bashira (床柱), is usually made of wood, specially prepared for the purpose. It can range from a seemingly raw trunk with bark still attached, to a square piece of heart wood with very straight grain. The choice of toko-bashira determines the level of formality for the tokonoma.

American architect Frank Lloyd Wright was influenced by Japanese architecture. He translated the meaning of the tokonoma into its Western counterpart: the fireplace. This gesture became more of a ceremonial core in his architecture.

== See also ==
- Fireplace mantel
- Higashiyama culture in the Muromachi period
