= Shoji =

Japanese sliding paper door

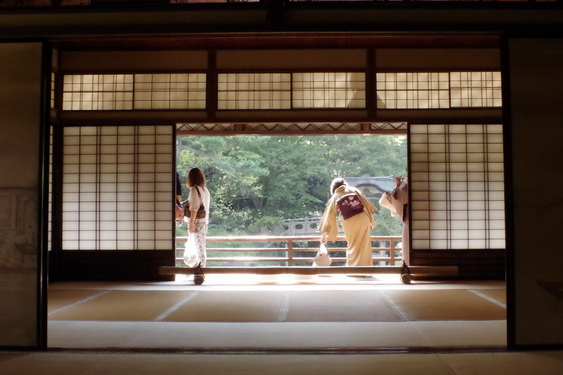
Shoji paper sliding doors in the Rinshunkaku at Sankei-en (Important Cultural Property)

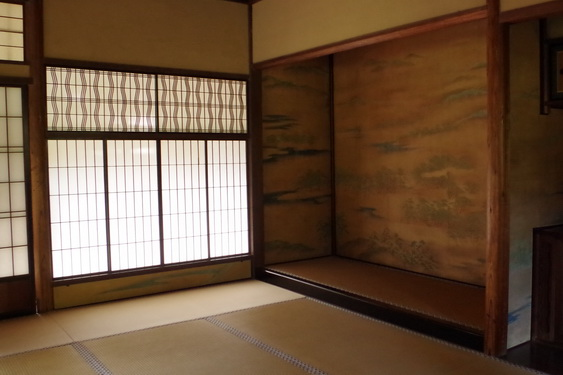
Shoji doors next to the tokonoma alcove, Rinshunkaku

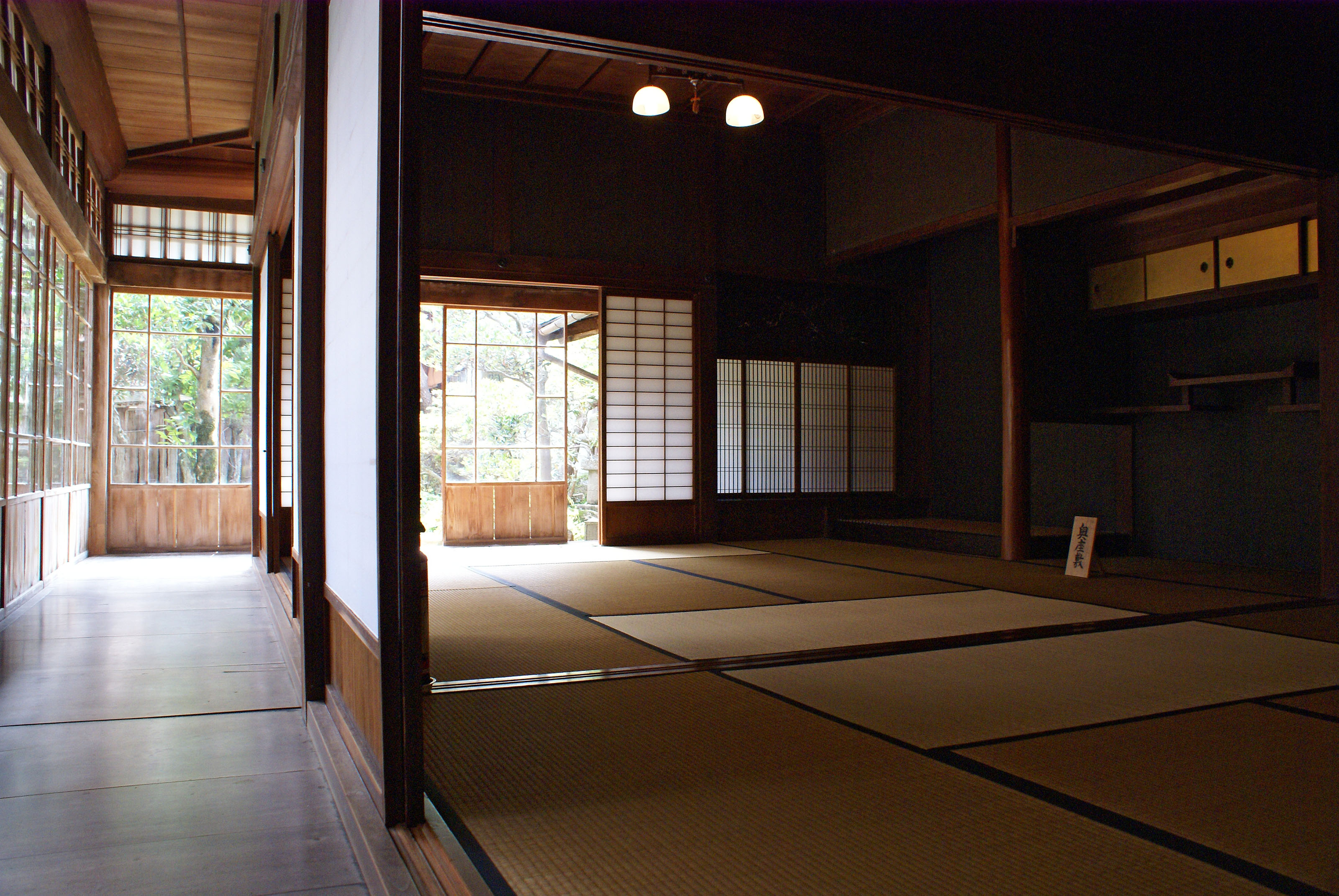
A tatami room surrounded by paper shoji (paper outside, lattice inside). The shoji are surrounded by an engawa (porch/corridor); the engawa is surrounded by garasu-do, all-glass sliding panels.

A shoji (障子; shōji, Japanese pronunciation: [ɕo:(d)ʑi]) is a door, window or room divider used in traditional Japanese architecture, consisting of translucent (or transparent) sheets on a lattice frame. Where light transmission is not needed, the similar but opaque fusuma is used (oshiire/closet doors, for instance). Shoji usually slide, but may occasionally be hung or hinged, especially in more rustic styles.

Shoji are very lightweight, so they are easily slid aside, or taken off their tracks and stored in a closet, opening the room to other rooms or the outside. Fully traditional buildings may have only one large room, under a roof supported by a post-and-lintel frame, with few or no permanent interior or exterior walls; the space is flexibly subdivided as needed by the removable sliding wall panels. The posts are generally placed one tatami-length (about 1.82 metres (6.0 ft)) apart, and the shoji slide in two parallel wood-groove tracks between them. In modern construction, the shoji often do not form the exterior surface of the building; they sit inside a sliding glass door or window.

Shoji are valued for not setting a sharp barrier between the interior and the exterior; outside influences such as the swaying silhouettes of trees, or the chorus of frogs, can be appreciated from inside the house. As exterior walls, shoji diffuse sunlight into the house; as interior partitions between rooms, they allow natural light deep into the interior. While shoji block wind, they do allow air to diffuse through, important when buildings were heated with charcoal. Like curtains, shoji give visual privacy, but they do not block sounds. Shoji are also thought to encourage a home's inhabitants to speak and move softly, calmly, and gracefully, an important part of the ethos behind sukiya-zukuri architecture. Sliding doors cannot traditionally be locked.

Shoji rose in popularity as an integral element of the shoin-zukuri style, which developed in the Kamakura Period (1123–1333), as loss of income forced aristocrats into more modest and restrained architecture. This style was simplified in teahouse-influenced sukiya-zukuri architecture, and spread to the homes of commoners in the Edo Period (1603–1868), since which shoji have been largely unchanged. Shoji are used in both traditional-style Japanese houses and in Western-style housing, especially in the washitsu (traditional Japanese-style room). The traditional wood-and-paper construction is highly flammable.

== Construction ==
=== Frame ===
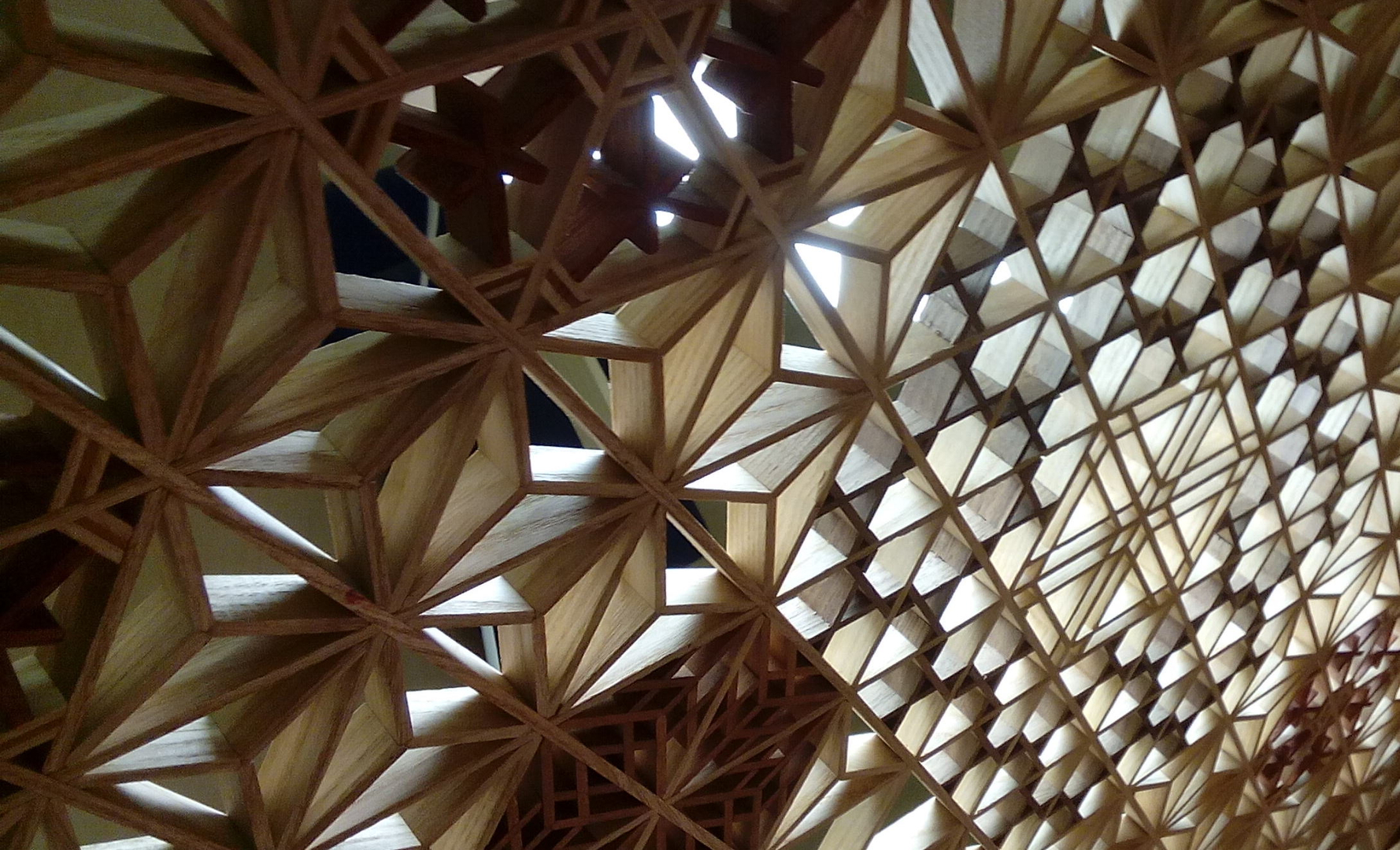
A complex kumiko frame, open

The shoji frame is a panel called a kōshi (格子; literally "lattice"). It is assembled from interlocking laths of wood or bamboo called kumiko. "Kumiko" literally means "woven"; the halved joints alternate in direction so that the laths are interwoven. The interweaving is structural, and the paper (which is tensioned by spraying it with water) further strengthens the finished panel. Frames can easily be broken by stepping on them when they are dismounted and stripped for re-papering. No fasteners are traditionally used to hold the frame together. Rice glue can also be used in the frame joints.

Coniferous wood is preferred for its fine, straight grain. Shoji with kōshi made of split bamboo are called take-shōji (竹障子). Kōshi are sometimes made of aluminium, shaped to resemble wood.

A halved joint

Most shoji lattices are rectangular. However, about 200 traditional patterns are used; each has a symbolism, associated with the natural pattern it stylistically represents. Patterns may also be combined. While these are traditionally used for shoji, they are increasingly used for other woodwork items, in and outside Japan. Patterns can be classified according to jigumi, the foundational grid; this may be square, diamond-shaped, or hexagonal. Rectangular shoji may skew, in which case bent springs of bamboo are inserted into the short diagonal to push them back square. (Note: Figure 111 and accompanying text in Morse 1885.) There can be substantial artistry in frame design.

The kumiko are the fine wooden laths of the screen, and the tsukeko are the heavier members (usually around the edge). The tsukeko are joined with mortise-and-tenon joints, with either a jaguchi joint or a more complex mitered joint. The jigumi kumiko are generally joined with simple halved joints, but where jigumi kumiko cross at a non-right-angle, or three cross at the same point (mitsu-kude), the angles can become complicated, and specialized tools are used to cut them rapidly. Small kumiko may simply be friction-fitted and glued.

While frames can be produced with minimal hand tools, specialized hand tools, power tools, and jigs for cutting identical lengths and angles speed the process. These tools are often homemade; as shoji-making is highly competitive, these give kumiko craftspeople a critical competitive advantage. While frames are handcrafted, there is also industrial mass-production.

Some simple kumiko types include:

- mabarasan shoji (疎桟障子) or aragumi shoji have large squarish openings, and are quick to assemble. This is the standard pattern used in most shoji.
- yokoshigesan shoji (横繁桟障子) or yokoshige shoji have rectangles that are longer in the horizontal direction; they are more common in the east of Japan.
- tatehonshigesan shoji (竪本繁桟障子) or tateshige shoji have rectangles that are longer in the vertical direction; they are more common in the west of Japan.

==== Koshi (dado) ====
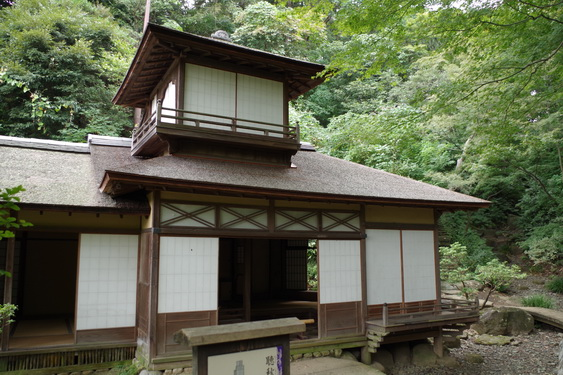
Shallower eaves mean higher dadoes

The lowest portions of the shoji, which are the most likely to get wet or kicked, might be filled with a solid wood-panel dado, called a koshi (腰; literally, waist or hip; not to be confused with kōshi, above). Such a shoji is called a koshizuke shoji.

If the panel is over 60 cm high, or around a third of the height of the whole shoji, the shoji may be called a koshi-daka-shōji (腰高障子; literally, high-koshi shoji). These are somewhat archaic, as they were designed to protect against rain. Now that shoji are rarely exposed to rain (due to being behind glass), the form in common use has a much lower panel, and is called koshi-tsuki-shōji (腰付障子). Manaka koshishōji (間中腰障子) have a central koshi.

The wood panels were often quite elaborately ornamented, from the late 1500s onwards. The outside of the koshi may be covered with wickerwork, or the inside papered. Pictures on paper were sometimes pasted onto the koshi board (haritsuke-e, 貼付絵); pasted-on pictures are characteristic of the Shoin style.

The koshi boards may be fastened to straight vertical or horizontal rails, which stand proud of the planks; older rails are thicker and often chamfered. The rails are often grouped in clusters; this clustering is called fukiyose (吹寄).

=== Filling ===
==== Open and semi-open ====
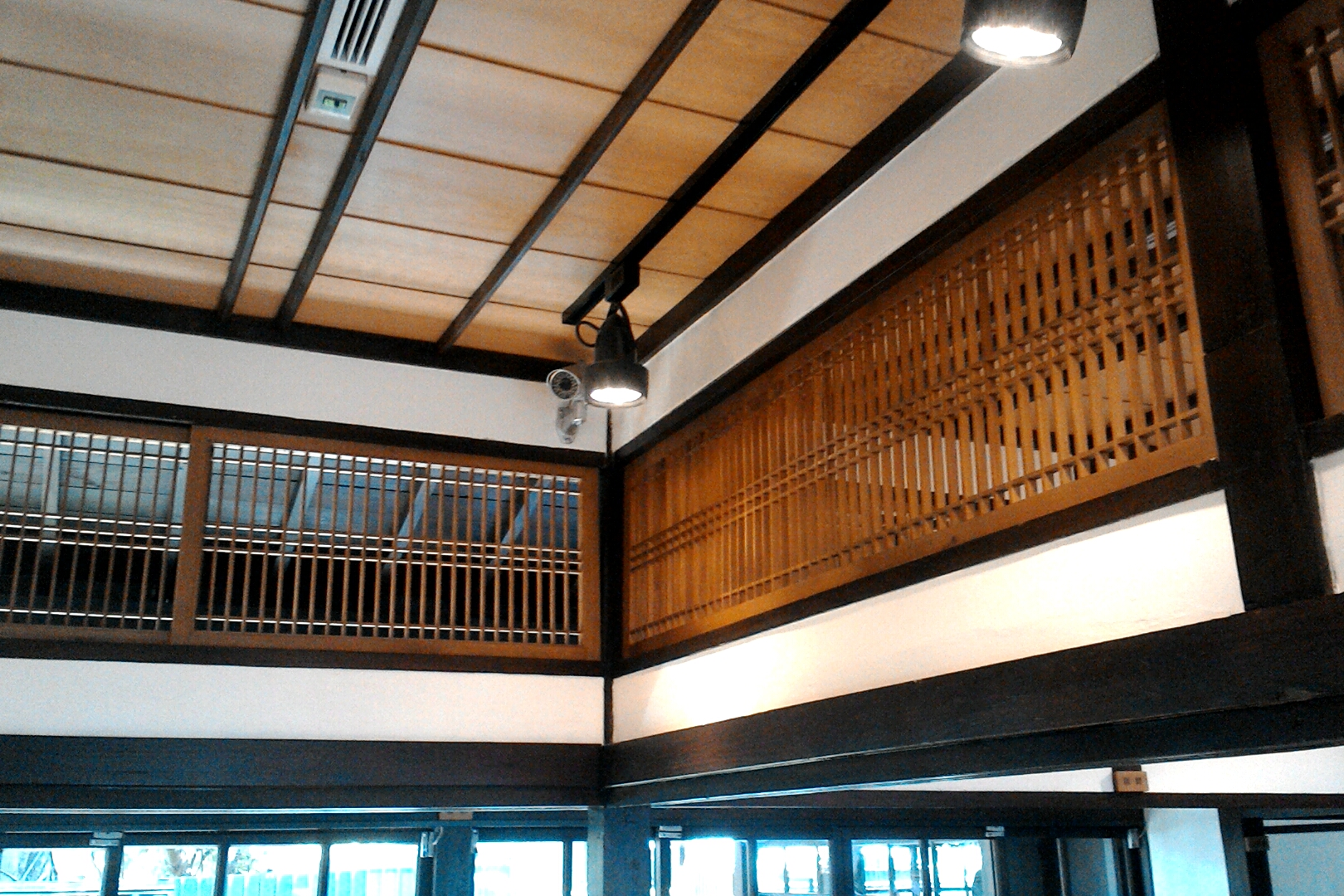
A ranma fanlight, unfilled for air circulation. Note fukiyose, clustered spacing of the laths.

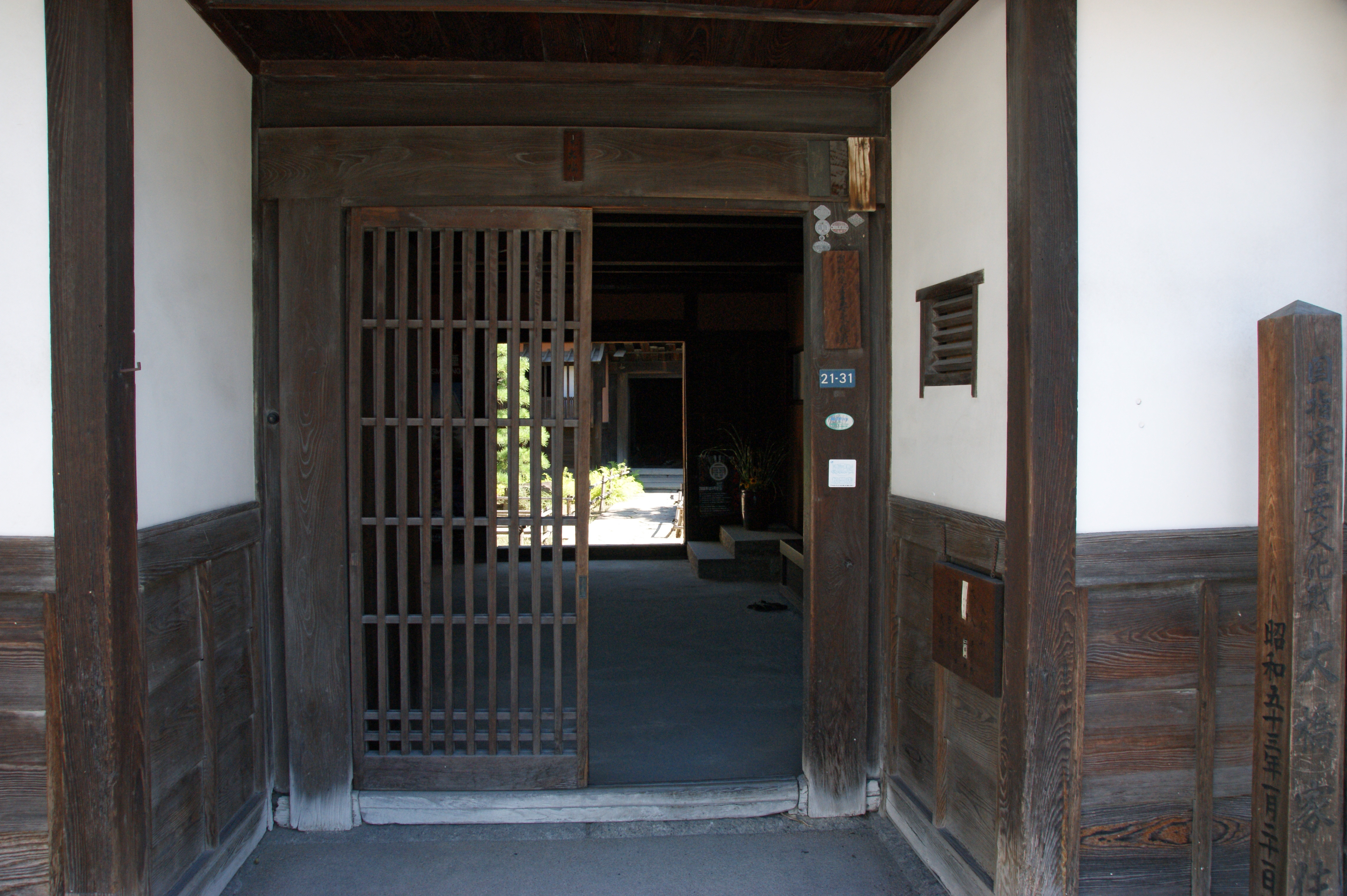
A kōshi door in a historic house, unfilled

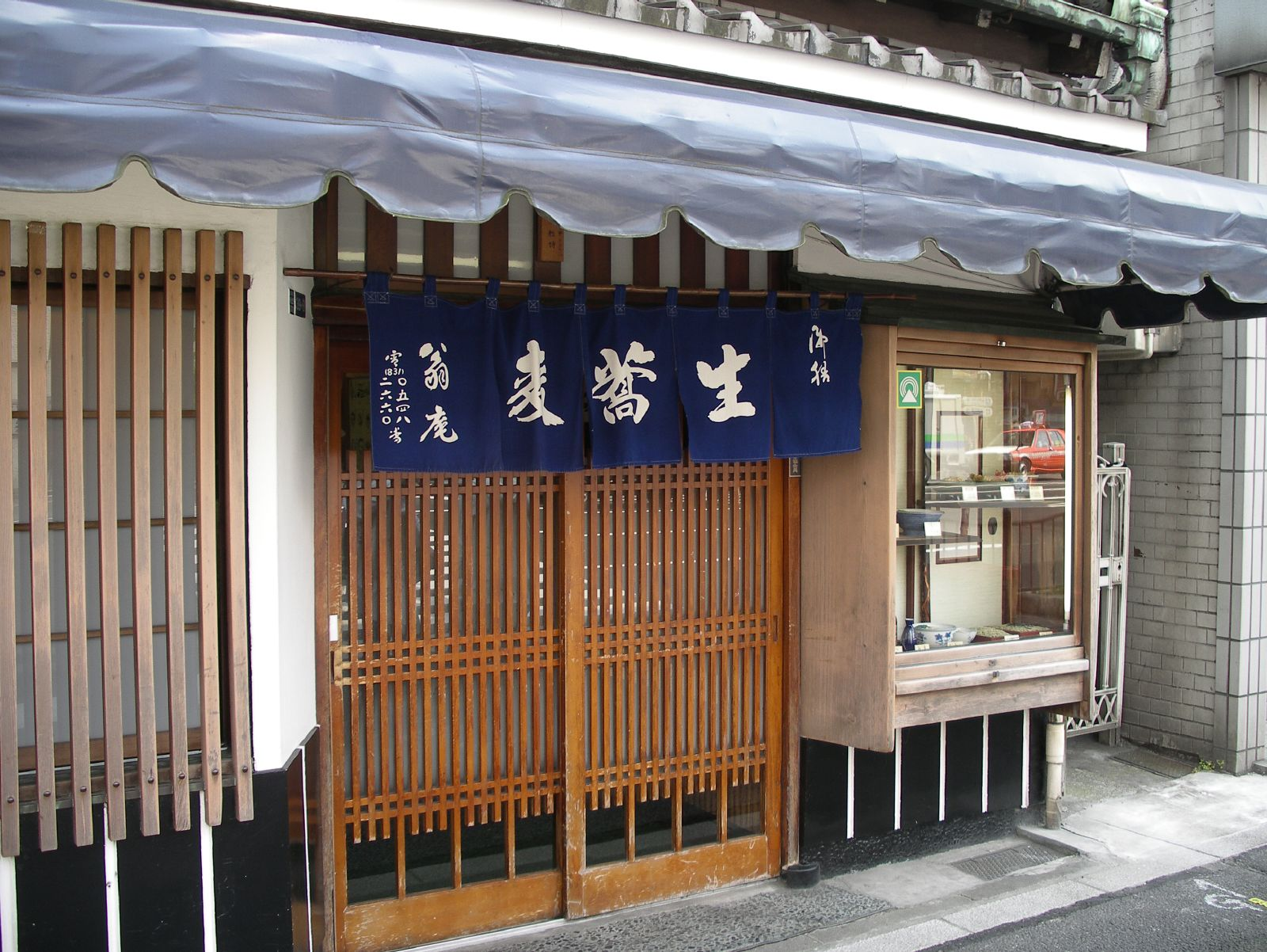
A kōshi door on a soba shop, filled with glass; left, simple kōshi window.

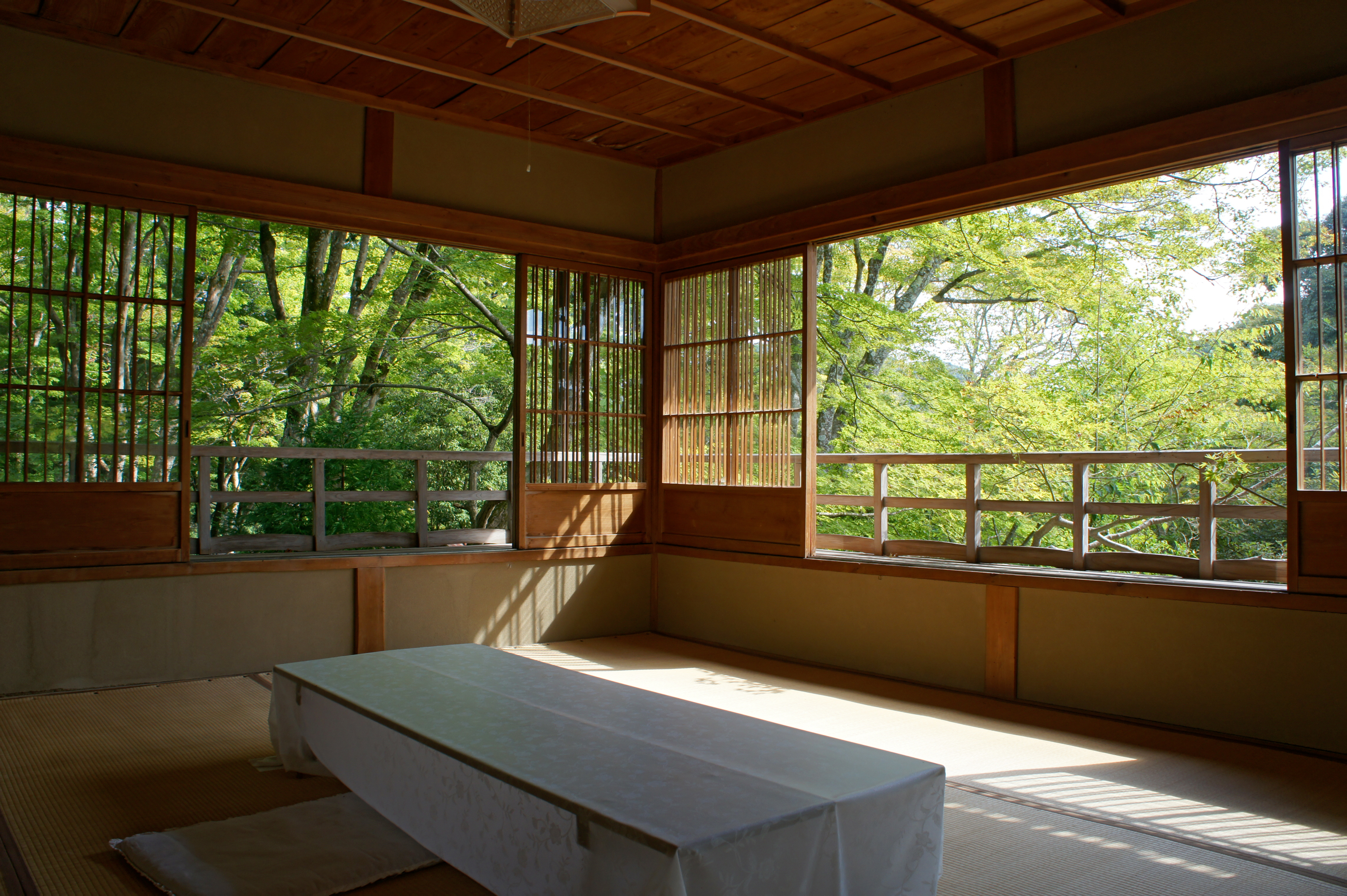
These sliding kōshi have been inconspicuously glazed, and are less sheltered than usual.

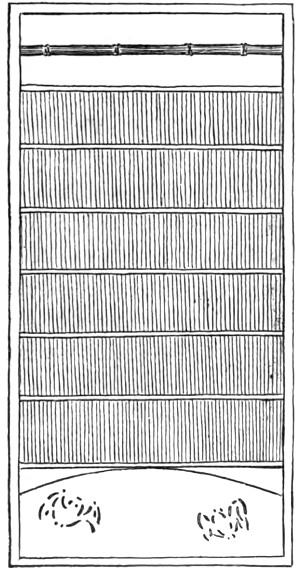
Reed shoji; koshi with cut-out bats, top section unfilled.

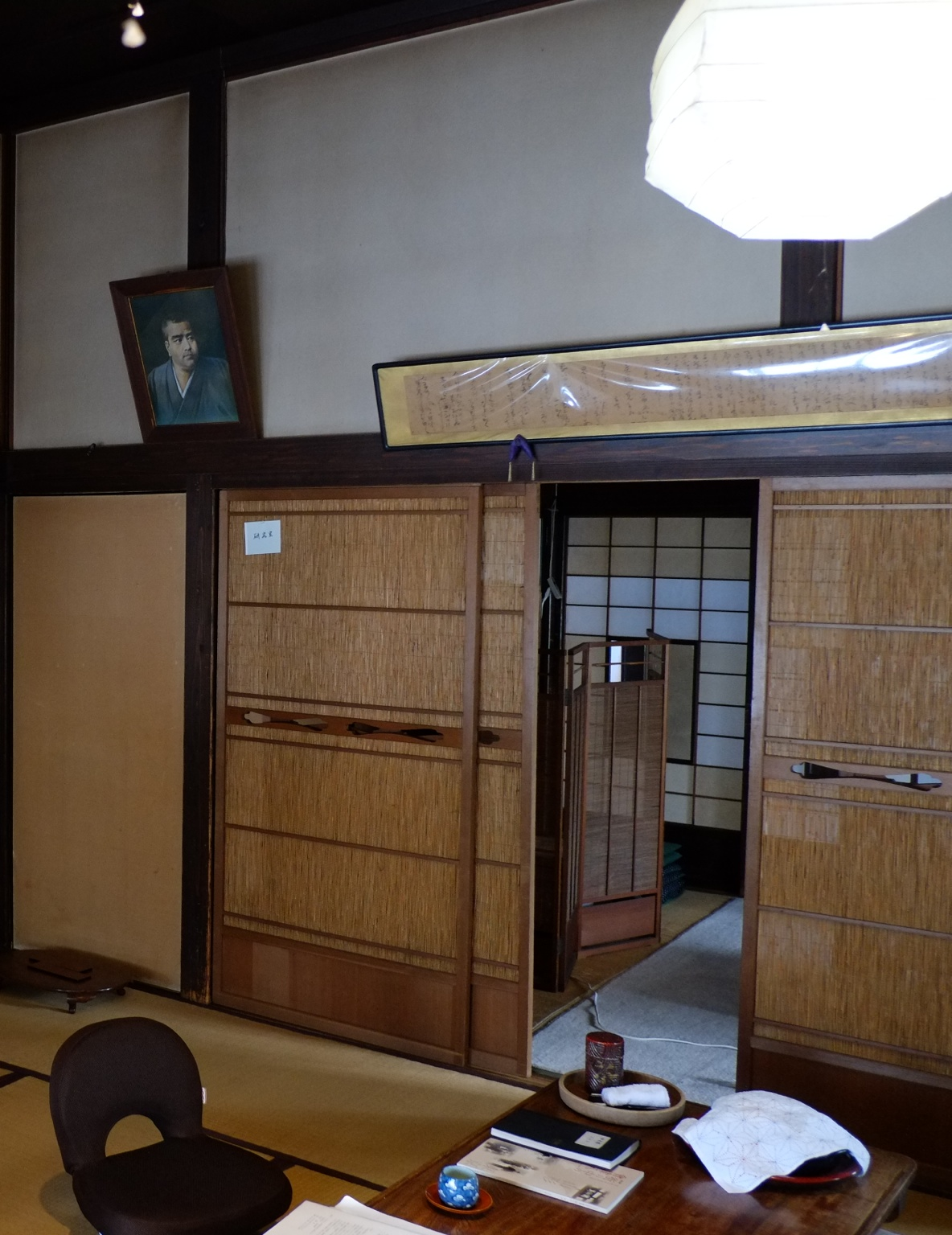
Sudare-shōji; beyond, a sudare byōbu and kami (paper-filled) shoji.

The spaces between the kumiko are sometimes left open, and the kōshi panel used as an open lattice, especially in summer, for more air circulation. Kōshi may be made into windows (kōshi-mado, 格子窓) or doors (kōshi-do, 格子戸). Kōshi that are traditionally left open are now often filled with glass; this does not require much change to their appearance or structure, and glazed kōshi are still considered kōshi. Some lattice patterns have heraldic meanings, identifying the trade of a shopowner, for instance.

Frames may also be backed with wire mesh, for ventilation without insects. Sudare-shōji (簾障子; also called sudo, 簾戸) are filled with Phragmites reed, cat-tail stalks, pampas grass, or fine bamboo, held together by a few rows of thread woven around the stems. These provide more shade and ventilation than paper-backed shoji, and are also called natsu-shōji (夏障子, "summer shoji"), as they may be used seasonally. For instance, in Kyoto, both paper shoji and fusuma will be removed and replaced with sudo doors and sudare blinds; this is usually done towards the end of June, before the rainy season ends and the Gion Festival begins.

==== Cloth and paper ====
Shoji are most commonly filled with a single sheet of paper, pasted across the back of the frame (on the outer side). Shoji may also be papered on both sides, which increases thermal insulation and sound absorption; the frame is still visible in silhouette.

- futsū ("common") shoji (普通障子) have a frame on one side, paper on the other
- mizugoshi shoji (水腰障子) have a frame sandwiched between two papers. Also called taiko shoji.
- ryōmen shoji (両面障子) have paper sandwiched between two frames

Shoji are not made with edible rice paper, though this is commonly asserted outside of Japan, possibly simply because "rice paper" sounds alimentary.

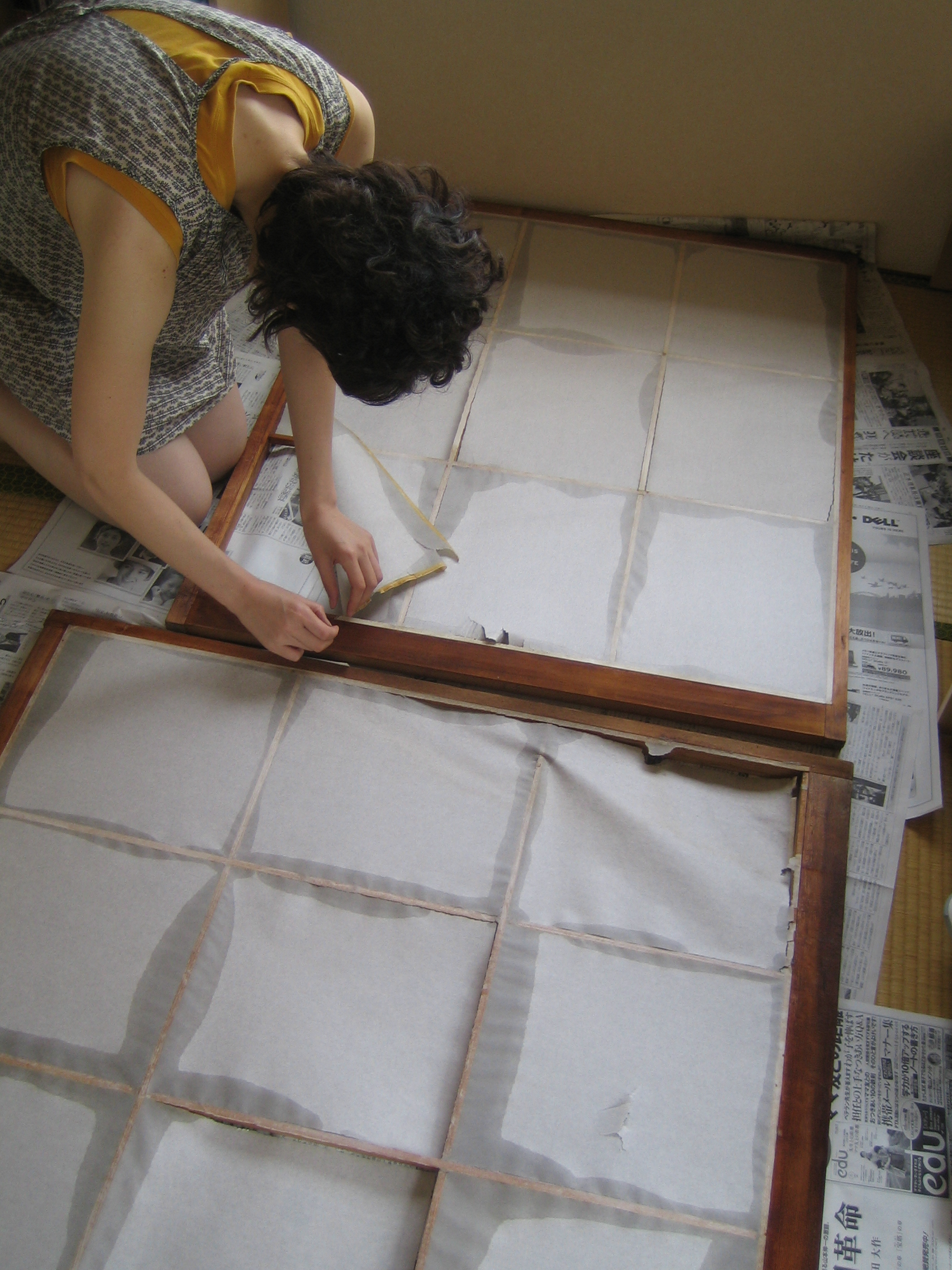
Paper on shoji is traditionally renewed annually; glue lines are soaked, and the paper peeled away.

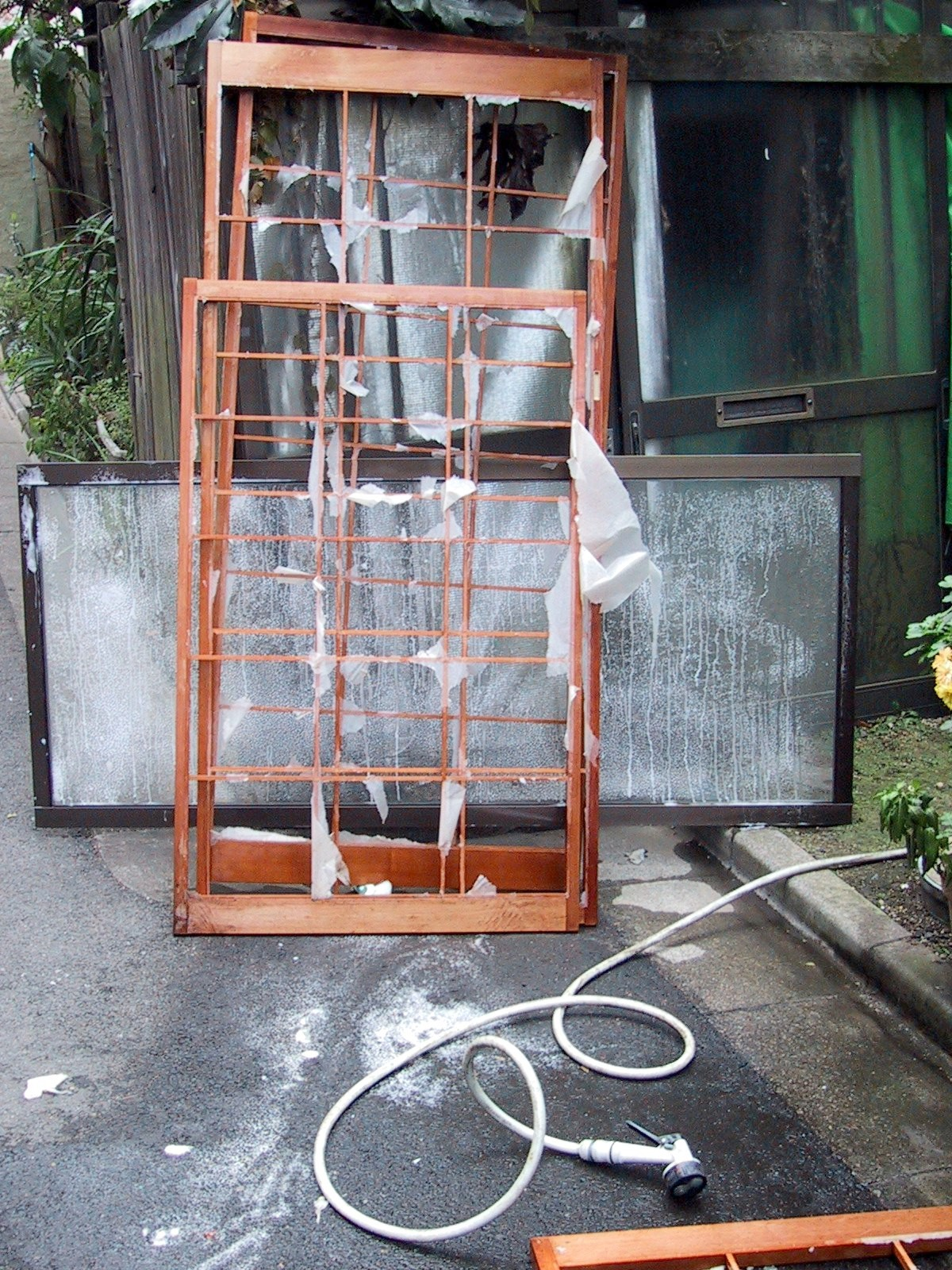
If peeled carefully, paper may come away in one piece. Remains of the paper are pressure-washed from the frame.

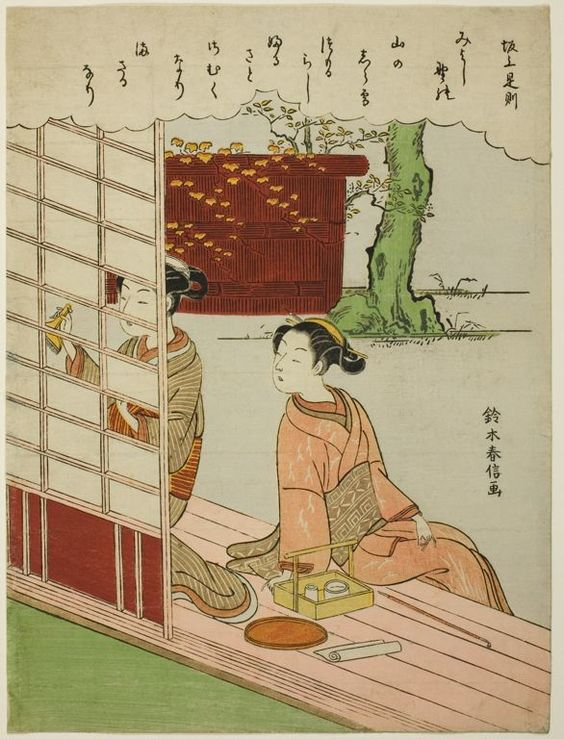
A poem about the chill of approaching winter is illustrated by a shoji-patching scene.

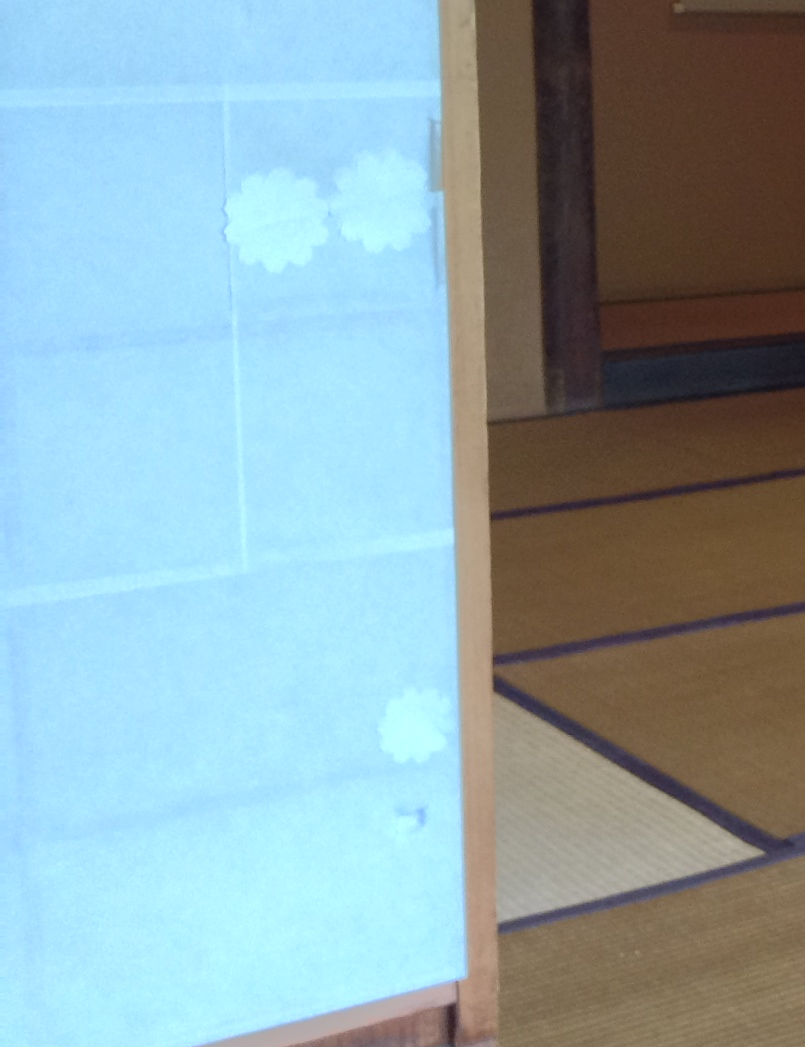
Decoratively-patched small rents in an unusual pale blue shoji without a hikite. Washi was applied in multiple narrow strips.

Cloth, usually a fine silk, has traditionally been used, but usage declined with improvements in the quality of washi (a specialized paper which diffuses light particularly well, and excludes wind). Washi is traditionally made from kōzo (mulberry, Broussonetia papyrifera), mitsumata (Edgeworthia papyrifera) or gampi (Wikstroemia canescens), or hemp fibers and it is sold in a broad range of types. Washi was formerly made in narrower strips, which were overlapped by a few millimeters as they were glued on; it now comes in wider widths, and in rolls or lengths the height of a short Japanese door. Bright white paper is most popular in Japan; off-whites are also available, but darker colours are avoided, as they would not transmit light. Washi began to be mass-produced in the 1800s, making it much more affordable. Synthetic fibers were first used in washi paper in the 1960s (mid Shōwa period). A small proportion of synthetic fibers may be used to increase tear strength. The optical characteristics of washi, such as its reflectance and scatter, are selected by the maker.

Paper is decoratively patched if torn, and, traditionally, replaced once a year in late December (sometimes less frequently, such as every two years). The rice glue used to hold it to the kumiko is water-soluble (wheatpaste is also sometimes used and double-sided tape may also be used, especially for laminated paper).

Laminated papers, coated in vinyl, last longer and are sufficiently waterproof to be wiped clean, but the thicker the plastic film, the harder it is to install. After glue is dry (~6 hours), non-laminated paper can be sprayed with water to tauten it (removing small wrinkles), but laminated paper cannot. Shoji paper cannot be used in places where it will get wet, like a bathroom; even laminated paper will be affected, as water bleeds in from the edges.

Traditionally, abura-shōji (油障子: "oil-shoji"), also called ama-shōji (雨障子: "rain-shoji"), used paper (generally nishi-no-uchigami, 西の内紙) that was glued on with vinegar-based paste and then oiled. This made them water-resistant, so they were used where rain might reach under the eaves. Oiled-paper windows were common in Europe, as European-style shallow eaves exposed the windows to precipitation. In Japan, deep eaves were conventional, and oiled-paper windows were rare.

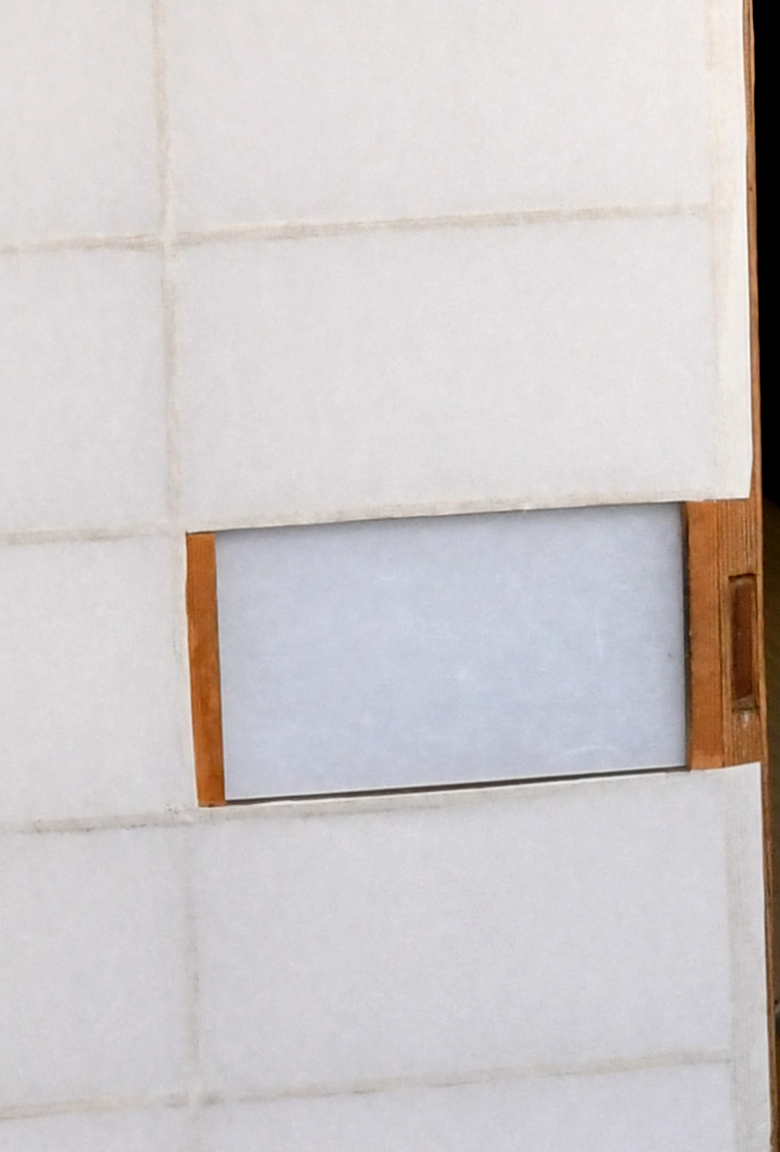
Shoji hikite (doorpull) (context)

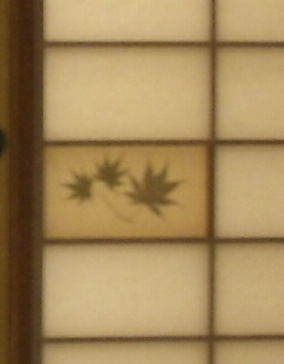
Decorated shoji hikite

The smooth sheet of paper covering the back of a shoji can make it difficult to grip and slide the shoji from the outside. To solve this, a single square in the frame may be papered only on the opposite side, and/or a groove may be cut in the outside of the frame (see image). This doorpull is called a hikite.

While washi paper blocks wind, it does allow air to diffuse through, allowing air circulation. This is particularly important in traditional buildings, in which charcoal is burned, and damp evaporates from the ground in the crawlspace under the raised wooden floor. Ranma (transom/fanlight panels above the sliding panels and kamoi) may have openings to further encourage breezes to pass through the building.

==== Plastic sheets and synthetic fibers ====
Less traditionally, rigid light-diffusing panels of plastics are also used, such as approximately 2 mm-thick acrylic or polycarbonate which can be frosted or bonded to a printed film. Fiberglass-reinforced acrylic is also used. Rigid translucent panels cannot readily be spliced; one continuous sheet must usually be used per frame. Plastic panels are waterproof, and some may be used outdoors year-round.

Paperlike sheets of plastic nonwoven fabrics may also be used, including polypropylene (like that used in surgical masks and other disposable clothing). A peel-and-stick film made of epoxy and white non-woven fiberglass is also used. (Note: A peel-and-stick film made of epoxy and white non-woven fiberglass is also used.) Nonwoven sheets of composite plastic (vinyl-coated polyester) fibers are also used, and may be attached with removable fasteners rather than glue, although they are still single-use.

==== Glass ====
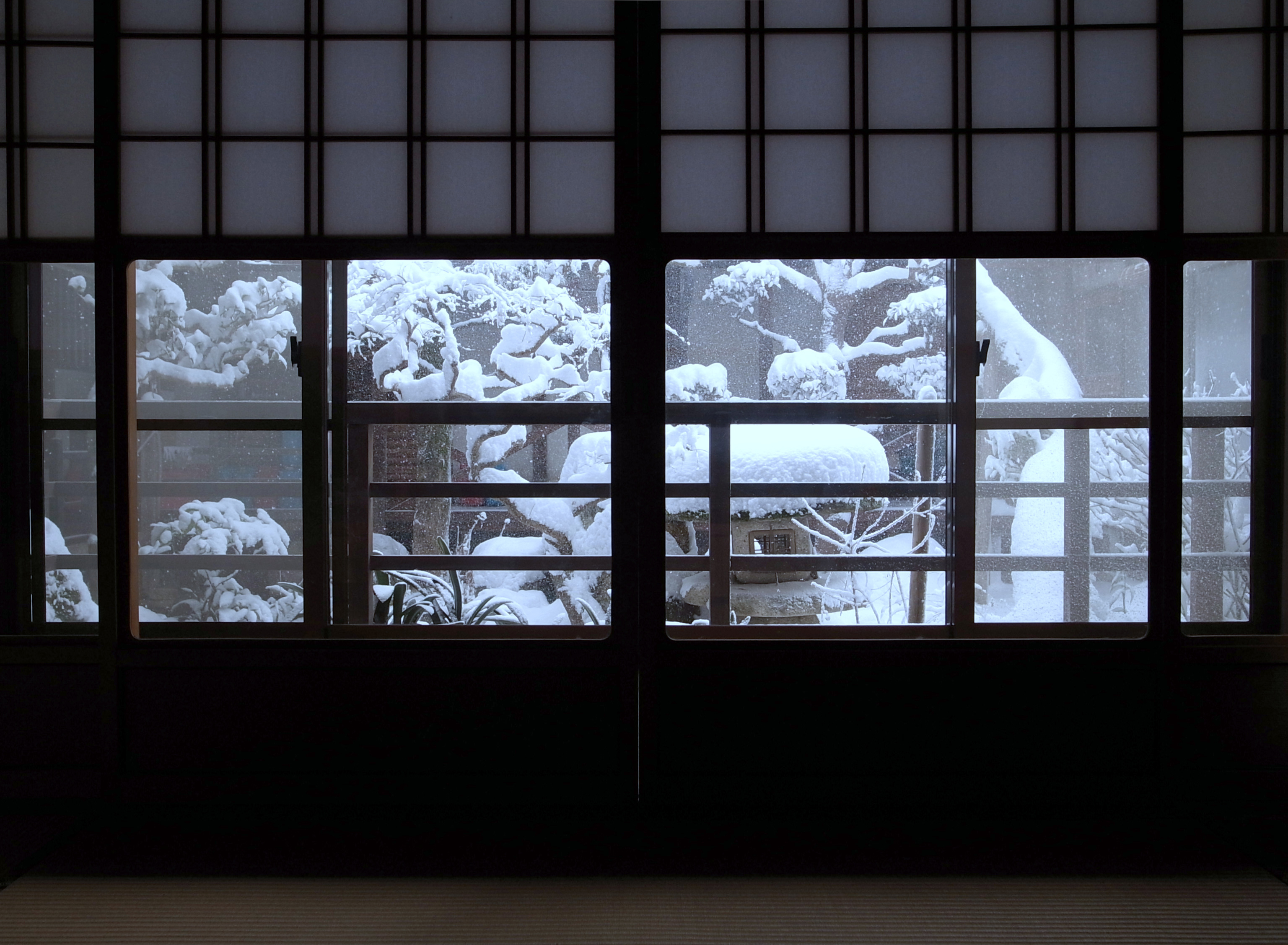
Yukimi shoji (snow-watching shoji) have glass panes. They allow a view of the outside in cold weather. These are jika glass shoji.

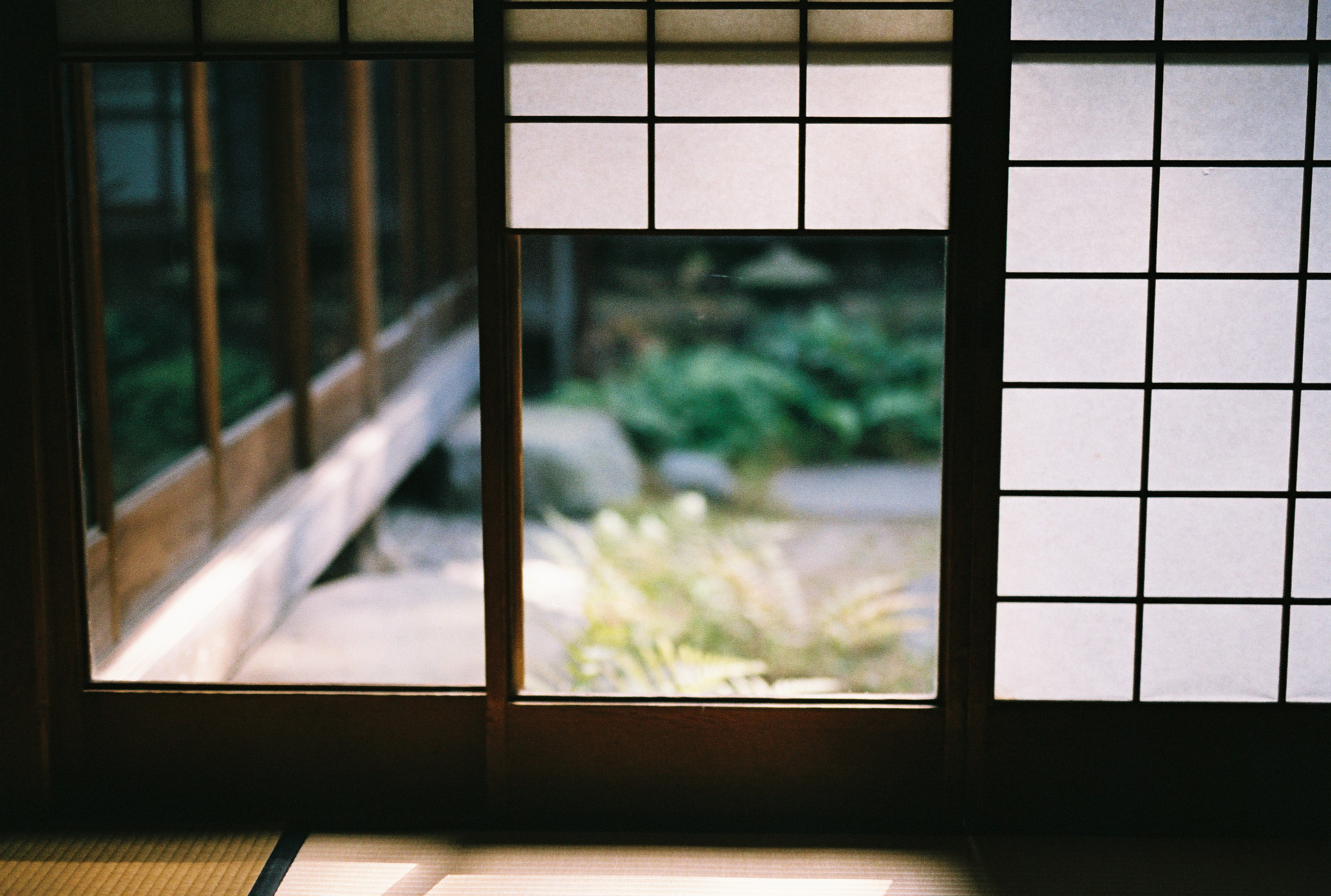
Yukimi shojis' translucent sections often slide, like sash windows, for privacy (left, open; right, closed; center, partly open). This is called a suriage or agesage shoji (摺上, 上下障子).

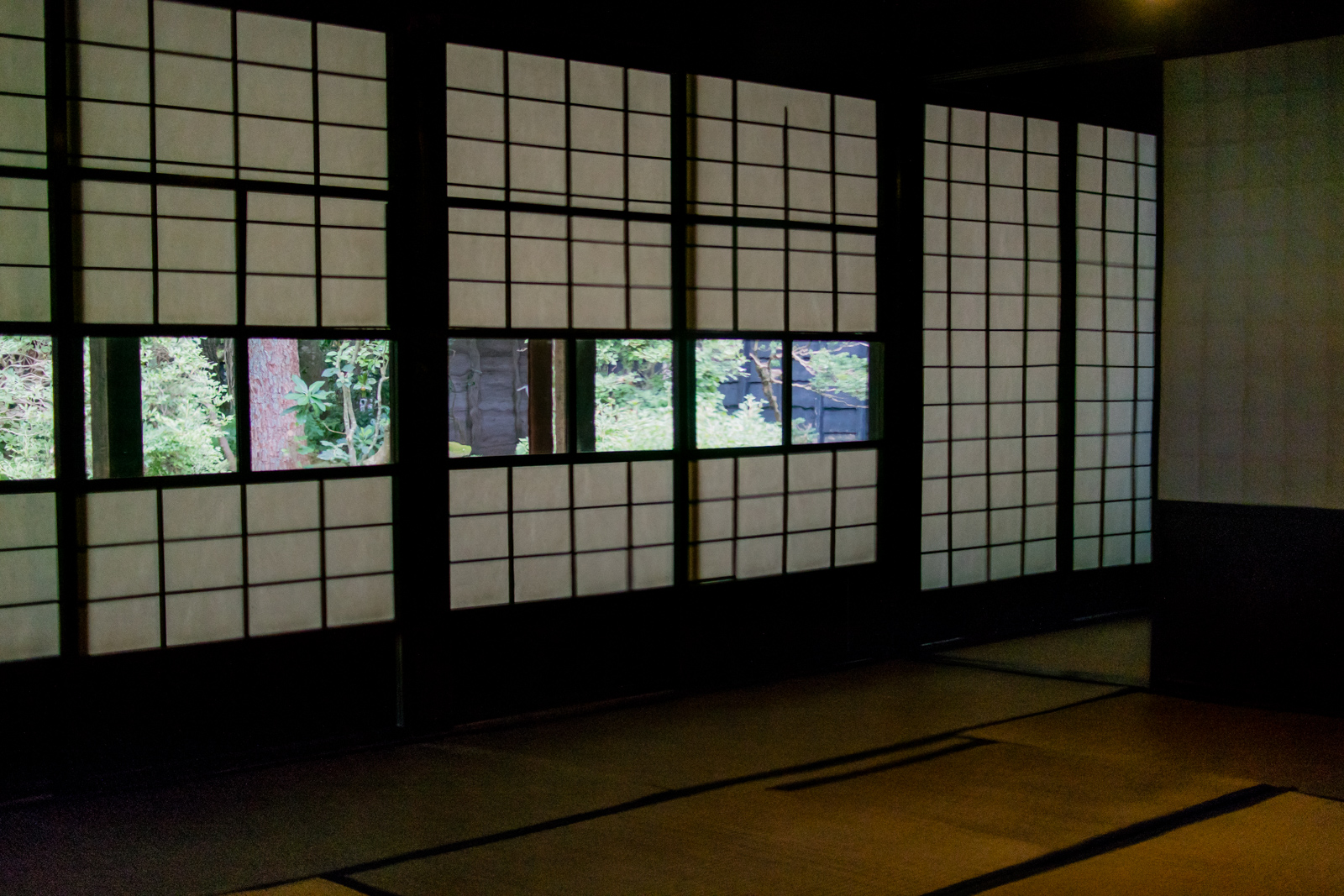
Another style of yukimi shoji, yokogaku shoji: full-width glass, surrounded by lightweight panes

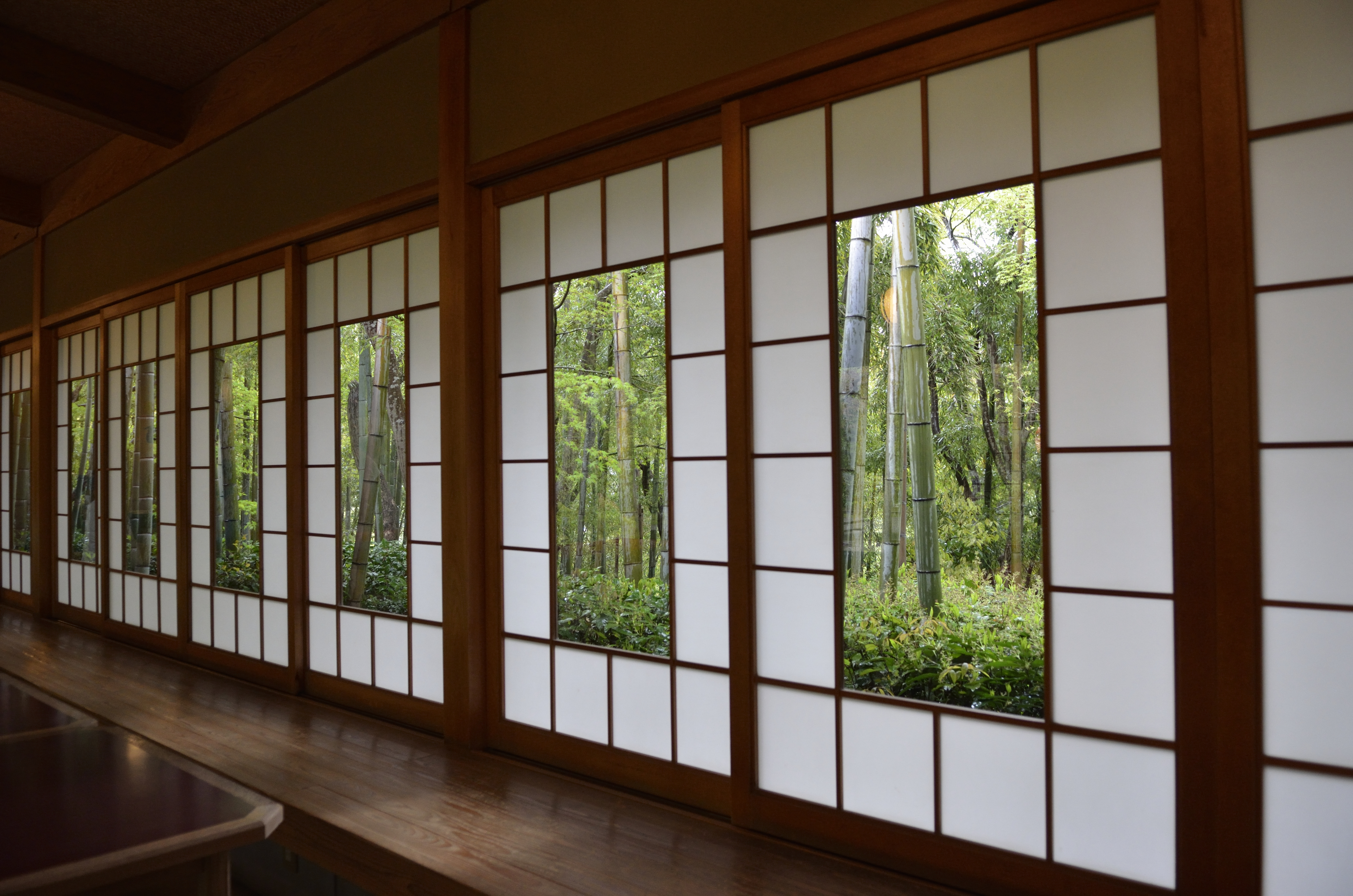
Another style of yukimi shoji, katagaku shoji: one central glass pane, surrounded by regular lightweight material

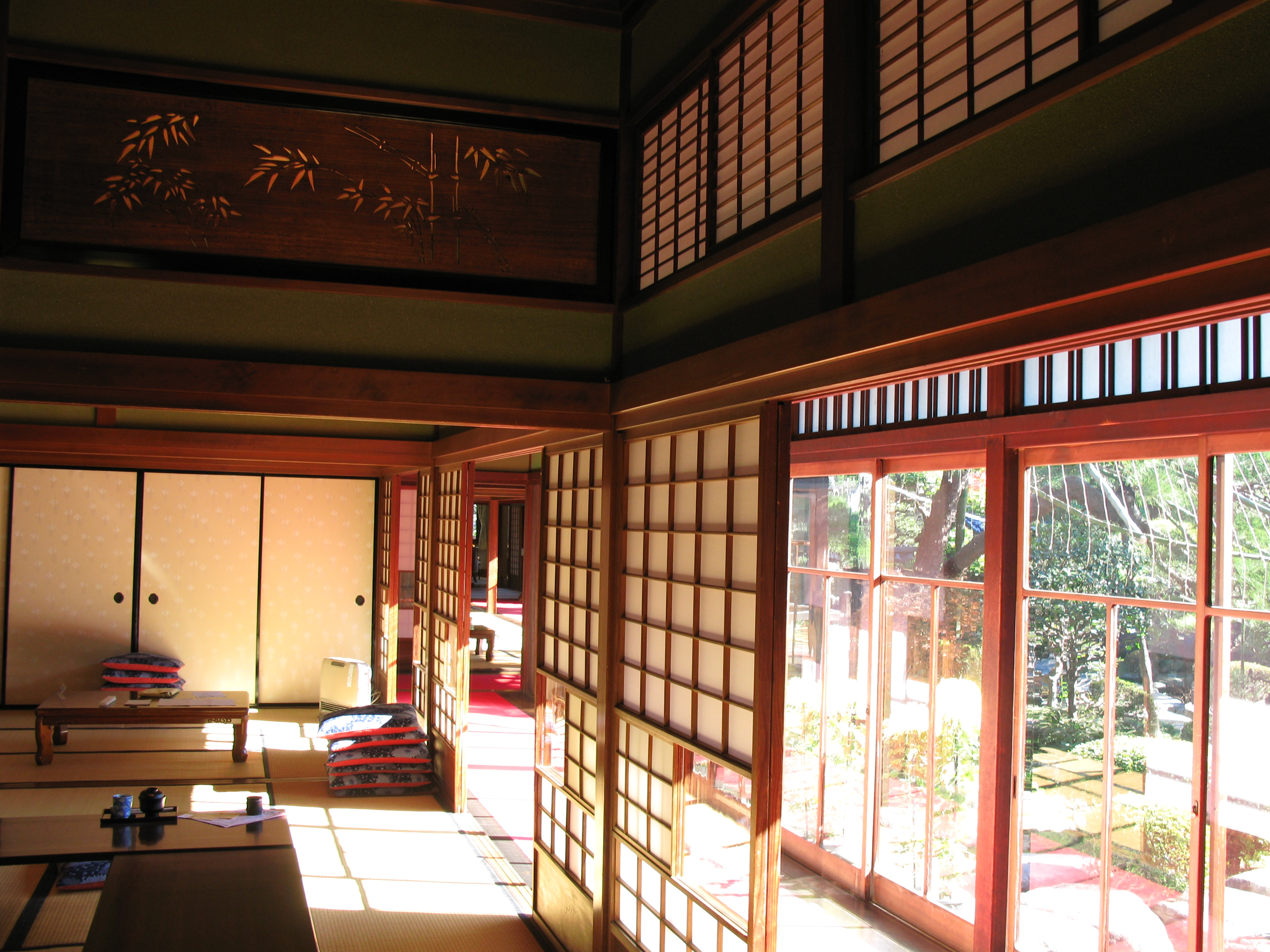
Paper-coated nekoma shoji (with sliding sub-panel for view) inside the engawa, and all-glass garasu-do outside

Nekoma shoji (猫間障子, also called mago shoji, 孫障子) have a horizontally-sliding translucent sub-panel (or two, for Osaka nekoma shoji), which can be opened from inside to give a view outwards. Until the late 1800s, these small panels were the only use of glass in shoji; blown plate glass was expensive and available in small panes.

Cheaper plate glass was introduced to Japan circa the late 1800s. It was widely applied to traditional kōshi doors, without much change to the traditional form and structure. The oiled paper in ama-shōji was also replaced with glass.

Yukimi shoji (雪見障子, snow-watching shoji) have a larger full-width section of glass, at seated-eye level, affording a view of the outside in cold weather. Glass can be used in large sheets or in small panes (the kumiko becoming muntins). Yukimi shoji also contain non-transparent translucent sections, for privacy. In suriage shoji, there is a vertically sliding translucent section; the translucent sections are divided horizontally like a sash windows. When closed, these then look much like standard shoji (see images). Peel-and-stick films that give glass some of the appearance of washi are also sold.

Sukimi shoji (月見障子, moon-watching shoji) are similar; they have upper panels that give a view, while the lower ones are translucent.

=== Fitting ===
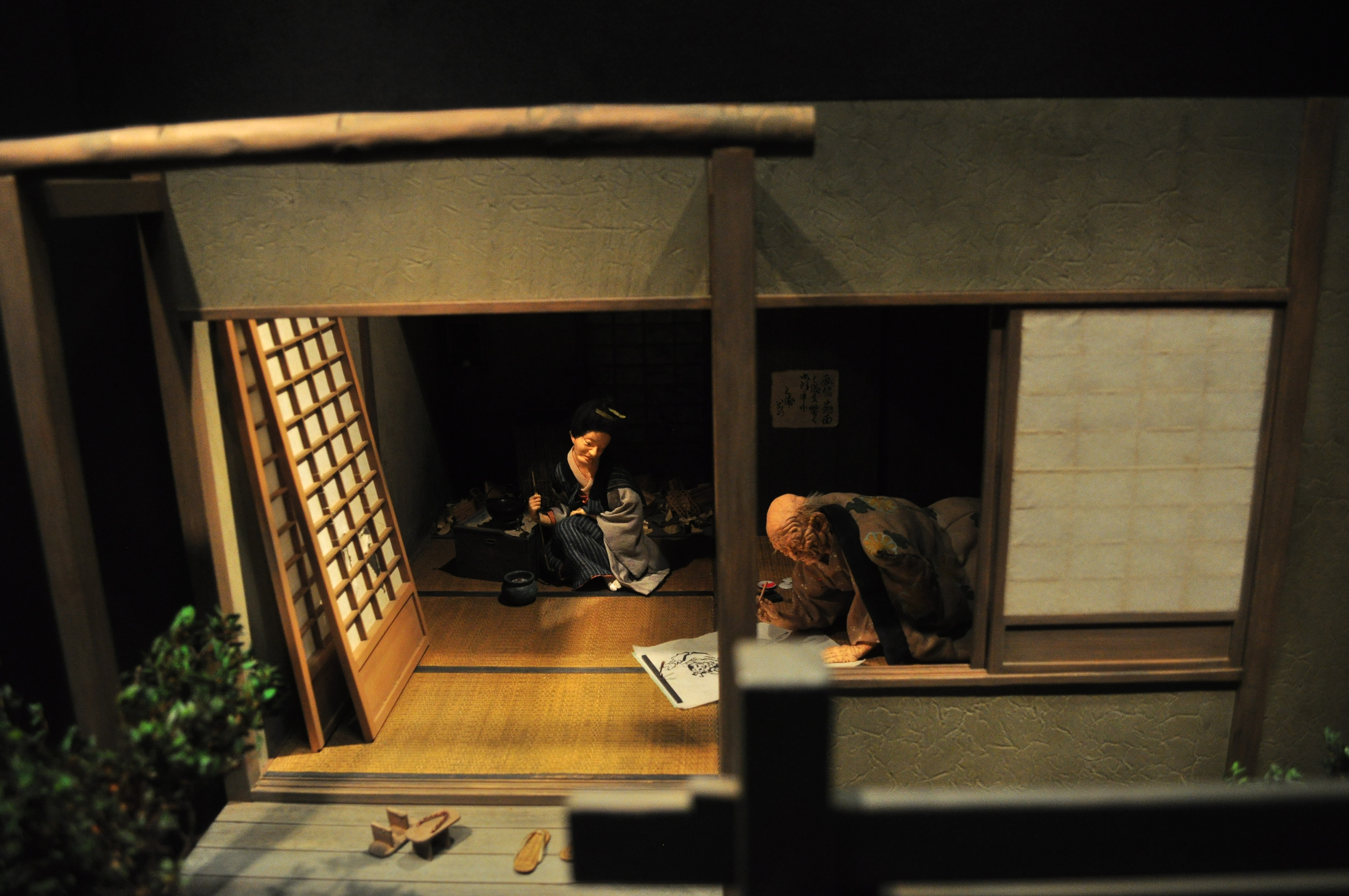
Shoji as usually mounted with two sliding panels in an opening. If the full opening is wanted, panels are removed. 2×2.5 ken house.

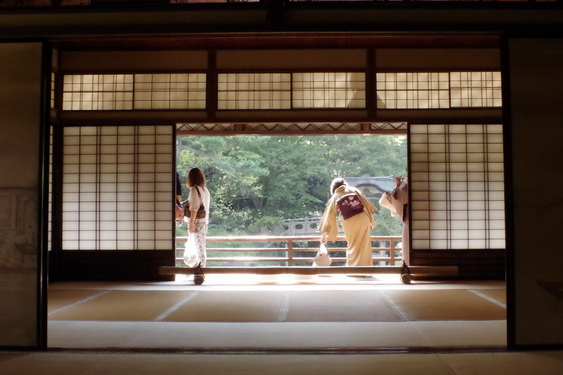
Four-panel opening at Sankeien, open. The innermost doors and outermost doors overlap fully; note that in the single-layer ranma above, the light is brighter, and the silhouette of the visitor stooping for her bag sharper.

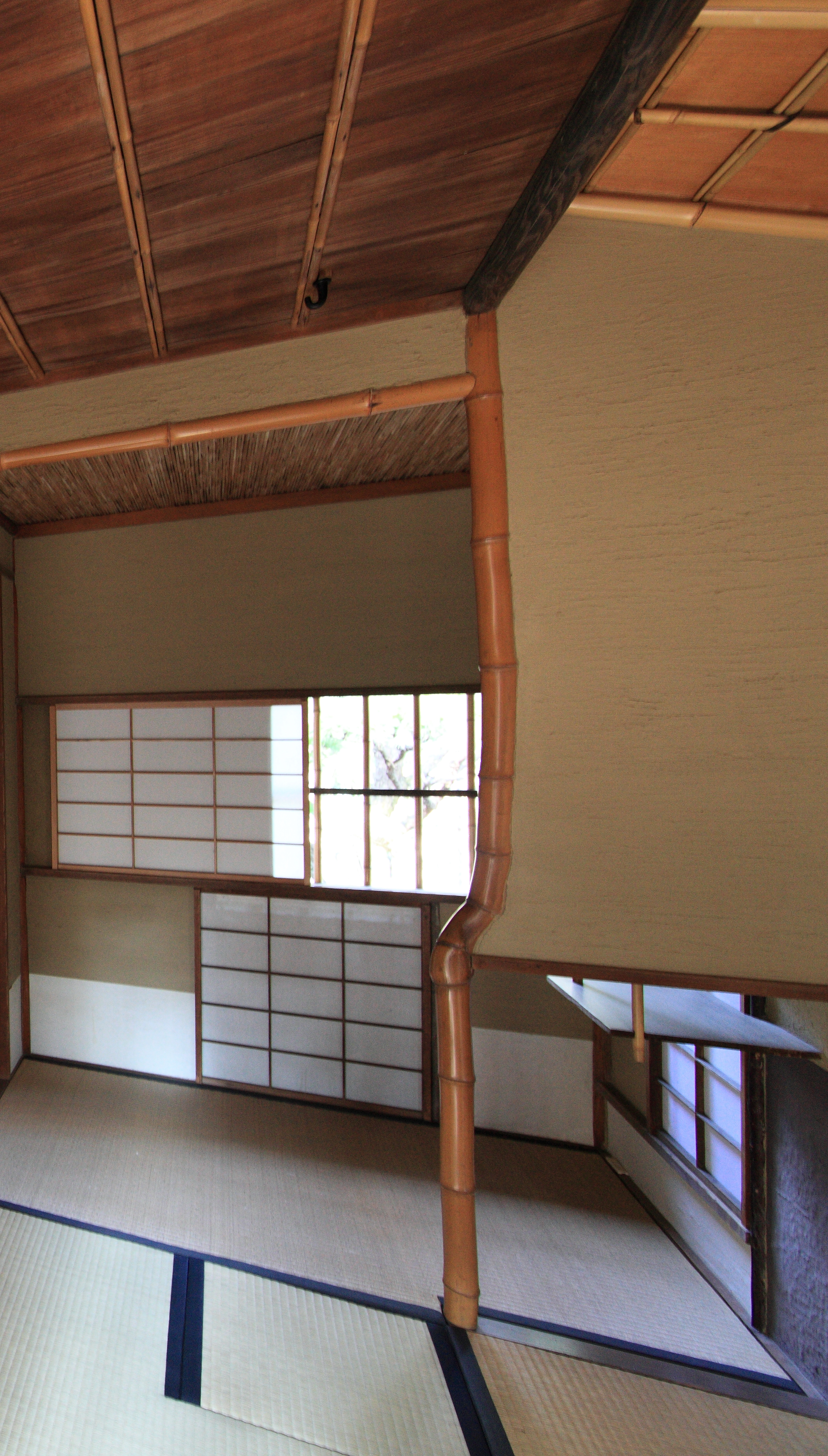
Top: katabiki shoji, on interior rails, slides in front of the wall. Lower right: a katabiki shoji which cannot slide fully open.

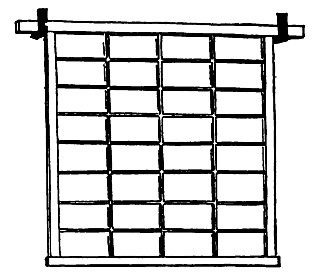
Kake-shōji hang from hooks; they are used for small windows in opaque walls.

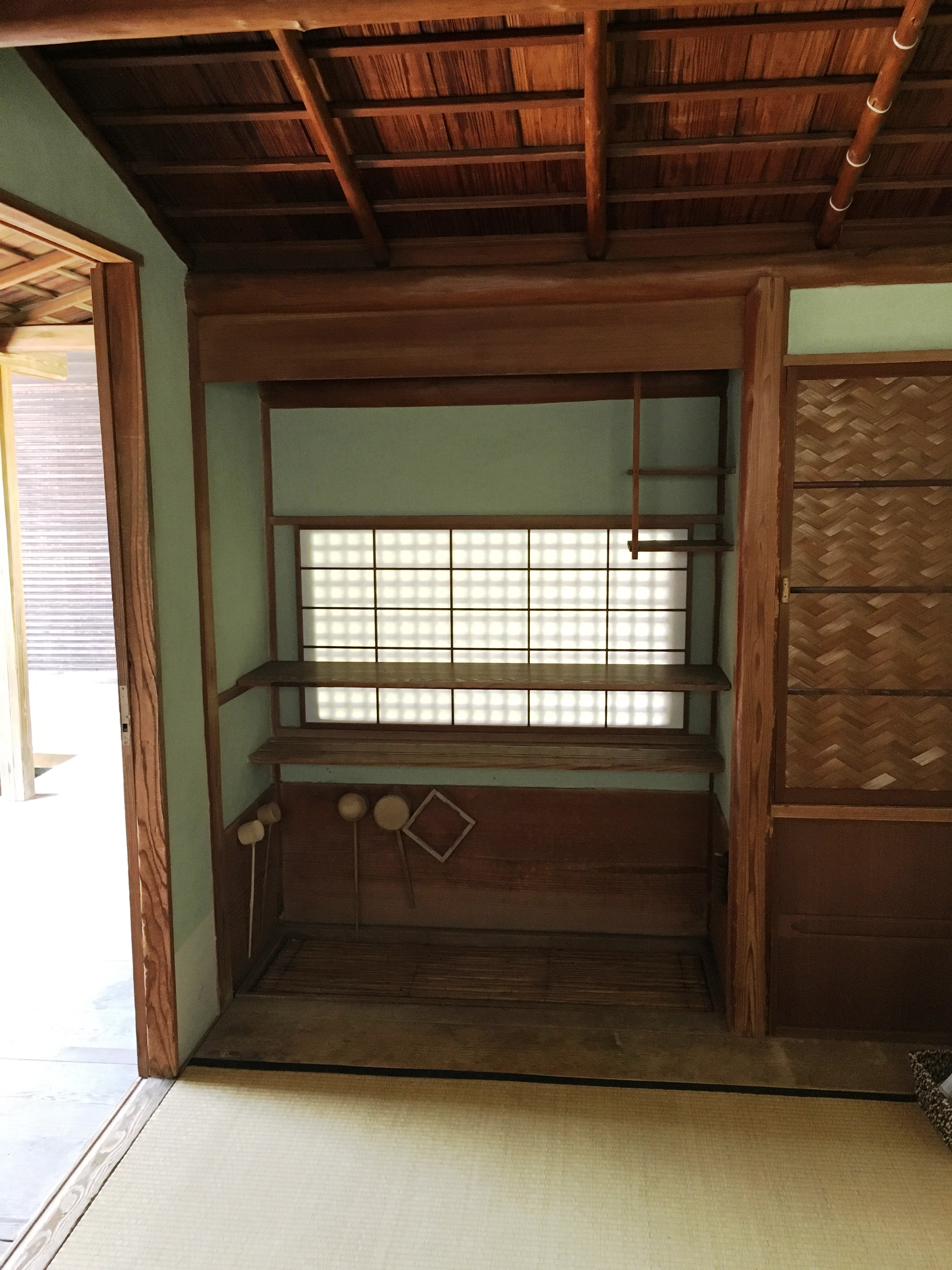
Center, kake-shōji. Right, opaque ajiro (網代: "wickerwork") on a cupboard door.

Shoji doors are often designed to slide open, (and thus conserve space that would be required by a swinging door); they may also be hung or fixed.

Most commonly, a shoji panel slides in a grooved wooden track. The upper groove is substantially deeper than the lower groove. The lower groove is cut in the shikii, or threshold beam ("the shikii is high" means "it is difficult to visit the place", or expresses self-consciousness). The upper groove is cut in the kamoi, a lintel between adjacent posts. The traditional wooden track requires precise fitting, and the wood may wear with use, or warp due to changes in humidity. A well-made traditional groove system is light enough that the door can be slid with one finger. Traditionally, grooves were waxed; more modernly, grooves may be lined with low-friction plastic.

Shoji are often mounted in pairs, with two panels and two grooves in each opening. When closed, adjacent sliding shoji overlap by the width of the wooden frame edge. Shoji are also mounted four panels to the opening. In this case, the innermost pair are generally mounted on the same track, and the outermost pair on a different track; A rounded tongue and groove are cut so that the innermost pair interlock. The double parallel grooves allow the shoji to be slid so that they occupy nearly half of their closed width; if a larger opening is needed, the shoji must be removed. As the panels are usually slightly different, it is important to put them back in the same order, without swapping them around, so that they will continue to slide easily. This type of mounting, where the panels overlap by a stile-width when closed, is called hiki-chigai (引違). Hiki-chigai came to be used in minka (commoners' homes) in the mid-Edo Period (c. 1700s).

Katabiki shoji (片引障子) are single panels sliding in a single groove. They slide on rails mounted on a solid wall, and when open partly or fully overlap the wall. They are used for smaller windows in opaque walls; this is common in chashitsu (see image). Small windows and katabiki mounting were used in minka until the mid-Edo period, but were then replaced by larger openings with sliding panels. Full-height shoji set up so that they can be slid in front of an opaque wall are not common in modern Japan. Washi-on-frame panels can also be used to diffuse an artificial light source; in Japanese lampshades, this use is both common and traditional in Japan.

Less traditionally, hiki (引) shoji (sliding panels) can be hung on rollers, which run on metal rails mounted on the side of the kamoi. This avoids fit problems caused by humidity-related changes in the dimensions of wood. Such rail-mount shoji require an anti-sway pin, but may otherwise have a smooth, unobstructed threshold. Such shoji are also fairly easy to remove.

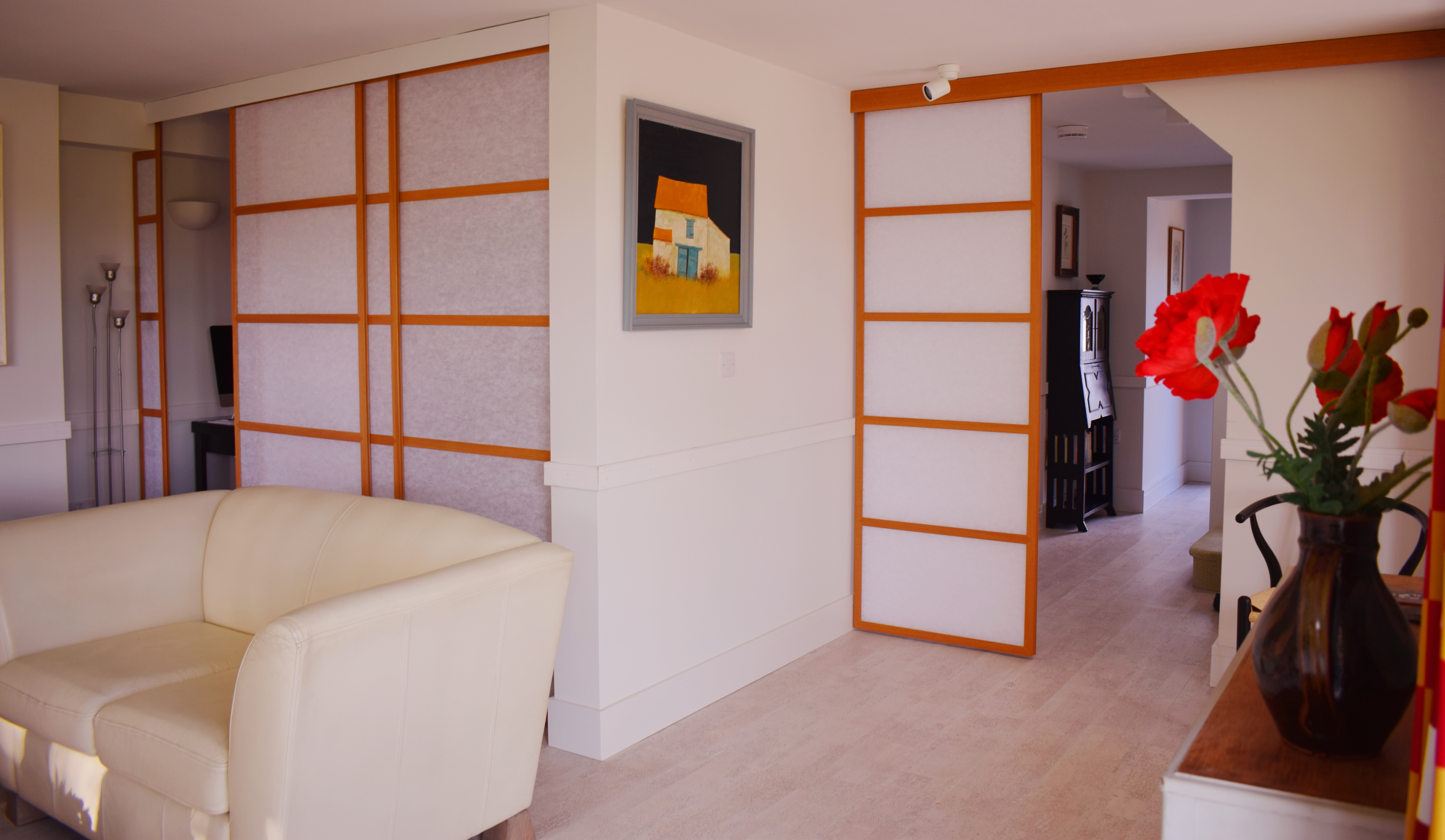
Fitted top-hung sliding doors in Cambridge, UK

Shoji may also be installed as pocket doors between rooms, called hikikomi (引込) shoji. This is a historical practice, but it is no longer common in Japan, though it is sometimes used in western-style homes. Shoji in Europe are commonly suspended on panel-blind track, by 'touch-and-close' fastener such as Velcro. No bottom channel is required or used – panels are typically 16–17 mm thick made from Obeche timber rather than traditional conifer wood. This method has the advantage of being less likely to break but can move in strong draughts.

Other suspension methods are sometimes used. Kake-shōji (hanging shoji) are mostly used in traditionally rustic chashitsu (tea rooms). They are commonly hung over small windows in opaque walls of mud plaster; they hang from bent-nail hooks, one on either side of the top of the window, and the topmost frame member is extended into two horizontal projections that rest in the hooks (see photo above). Like katabiki shoji, kake shoji may be placed on the inside or the outside of the wall, depending on what suits the window.

Hiraki shoji are mounted on hinges in a doorframe, and open like a standard western door. Some are single doors, some double doors. Double doors, whether bifold doors or not, are termed ryōbiraki shoji (両開障子).

Tsukuritsuke shoji (造付障子, "fixed shoji"), are often horizontal strips.

== Development and use ==
=== Hashira-ma equipment ===
Traditional Japanese buildings are post-and-lintel structures. They are built around vertical posts, connected by horizontal beams (rafters were traditionally the only structural member that was neither horizontal nor vertical). The rest of the structure is non-load-bearing.

The roof completed, all but the cheapest buildings also added a raised plank floor (except in the kitchen). The remaining question was what to do with the space between the pillars, the hashira-ma (柱間, はしらま).

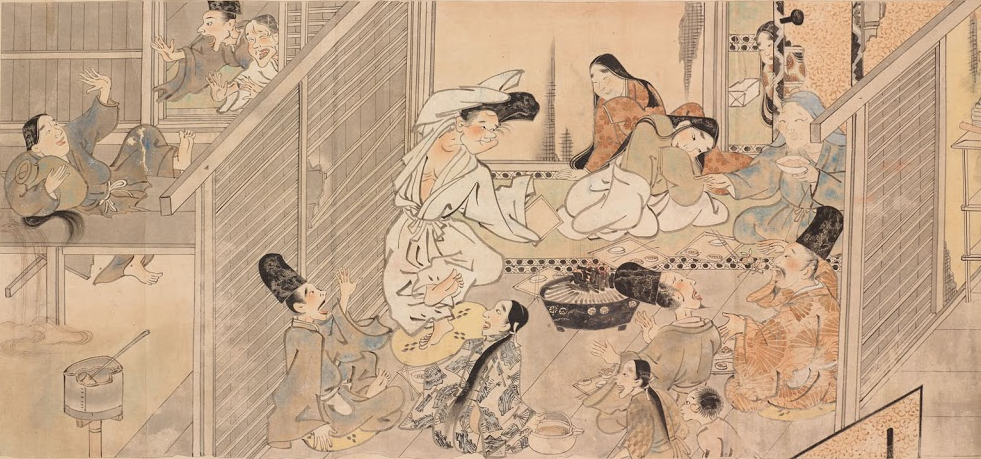
A family celebrates new wealth; dilapidated plaster walls, maira-do, and fusuma. No shoji. Copy of a late Kamakura period/early 1300s work.

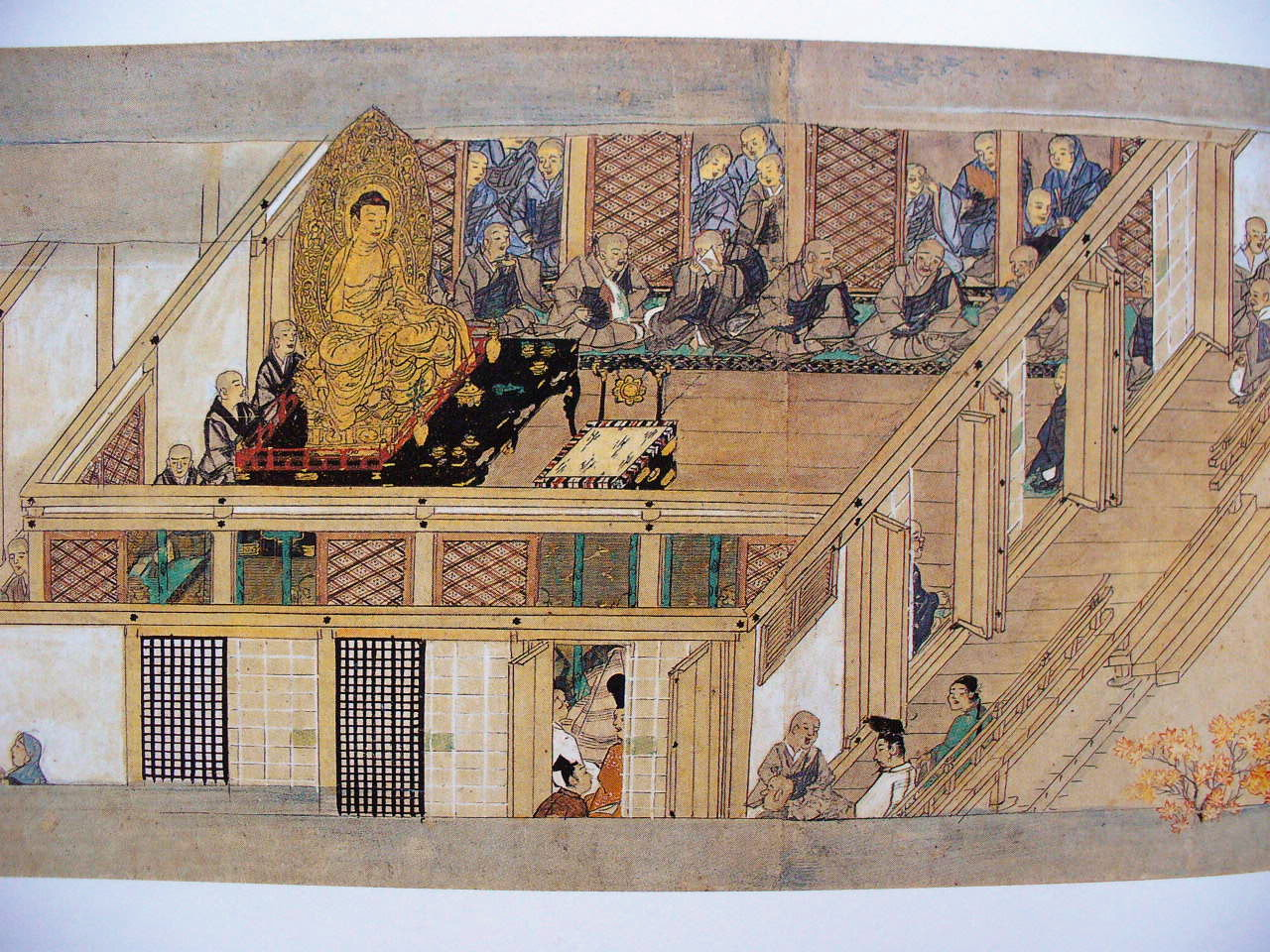
A very early depiction of translucent shoji (late Kamakura period/early 1300s)

The hashira-ma might be filled with fixed walls, in cheaper Japanese homes. For example, there might be lath-and-plaster walls, or in colder areas thatch walls; these are still used in rustic teahouses and historic buildings (see images). Bark-and-bamboo walls, clapboard, and board-and-batten walls were also used. Where affordable, though, the tendency was against permanent walls. Instead, openable or removable screens were used, and their type, number, and position adjusted according to the weather without and the activities within. These items can collectively be termed hashira-ma equipment.

The technology of hashira-ma equipment has developed over time, and shoji were among those developments. Shoji have imposed constraints on other types of hashira-ma equipment: being translucent, non-waterproof, light, and fragile, they need protection, but they also need access to light.

=== History ===
Literally, shoji means "small obstructing thing" (障子; it might be translated as "screen"), and though this use is now obsolete, shoji was originally used for a variety of sight-obstructing panels, screens, or curtains, many portable, either free-standing or hung from lintels, used to divide the interior space of buildings (see List of partitions of traditional Japanese architecture). While shoji now exclusively means a translucent framework screen, and "fusuma" an opaque one, historic terminology is less clear-cut.

Cloth-covered frame panels that fit between pillars (but did not yet slide in grooves) were invented in the 600s. They were used to screen bedrooms (like the curtains on a canopy bed), and called fusuma shoji (there were also bedclothes called "fusuma"). When paper came to be used instead of cloth, fusuma shoji were also called karakami shoji. From the late 1100s to the early 1200s, translucent cloth and paper shoji were called akari-shōji (明障子), "illuminating shoji". It is not clear when translucent shoji were first used.

The symmetrical round-pillared shinden style developed in the mid-900s, for the lakeside palaces of aristocrats. The outside could be closed off with heavy wooden shutters called shitomi-do (蔀戸), which were usually horizontally split and hinged (hajitomi), but were occasionally vertically split and hinged.

Sliding partitions (hiki-do, 引戸, literally "sliding door") did not come into use until the tail end of the Heian, and the beginning of the Kamakura period. Early sliding doors were heavy; some were made of solid wood. Initially used in expensive mansions, they eventually came to be used in more ordinary houses as well.

Shutters used with shoji

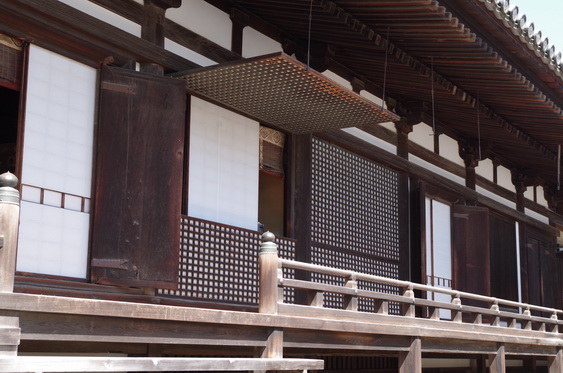
Hajitomi are split, and hinged, horizontally. Here the bottom halves have been lifted out. There are shoji behind the hajitomi.

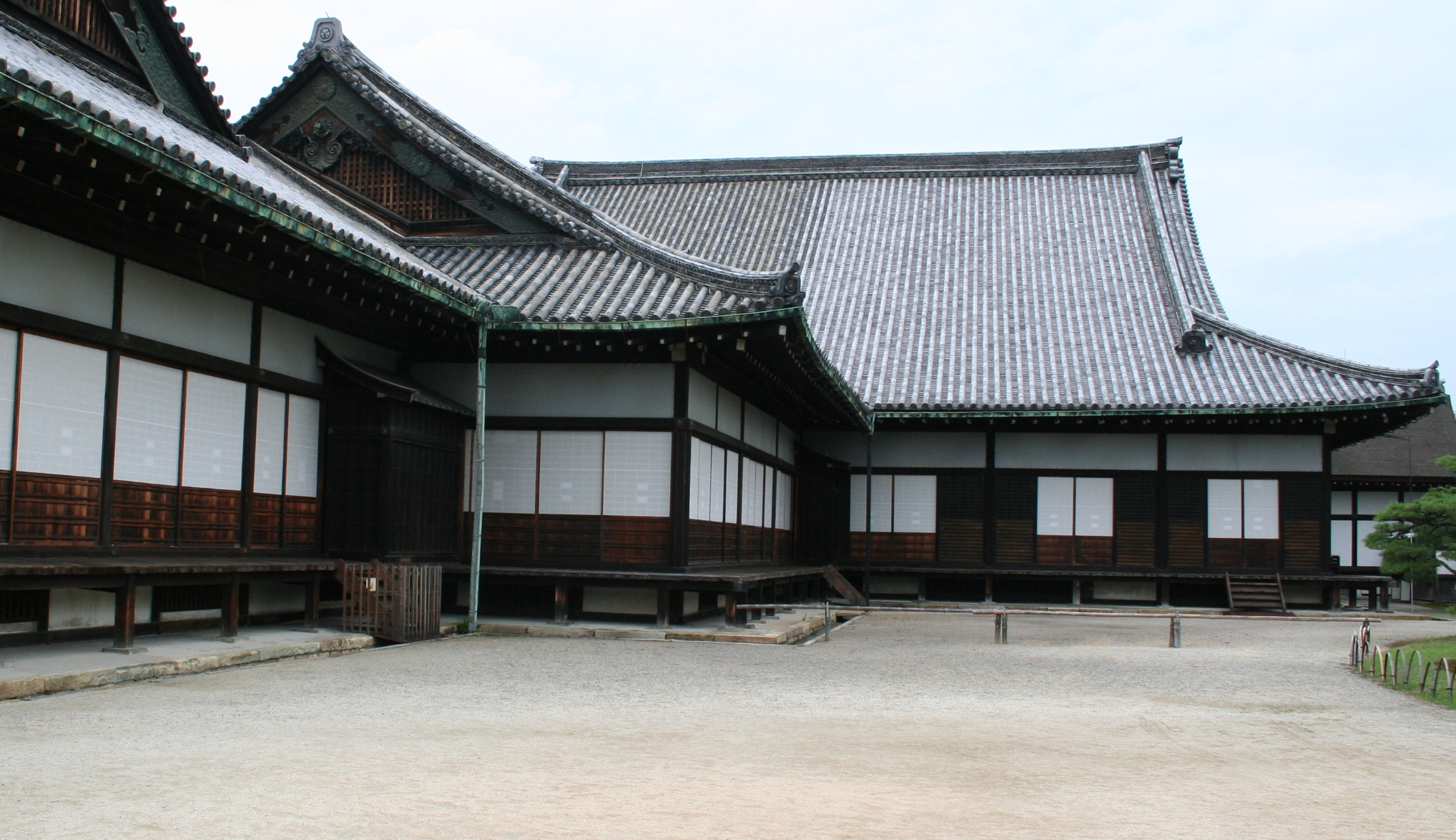
On the right, three grooves, three panels. The maira-do are open, and the single shoji panel closed; half of the area is still filled with the maira-do. The building to the left is newer; its outer groove runs outside the pillars. The shutters are packed away in the to-bukuros in the corners, and the shoji in the inner two grooves run uninterrupted (close-up).

Plan view of the mairado and amado shutter systems, showing rotator and to-bukuro. Black squares are pillars. Shoji in white, shutters in black, grooves in grey. See also external movie.

Section through Sukiya-style middle-class home of the early 1880s

Smooth fitting of panel and groove is critical to allow the panels to move easily, and the woodworking of the sliding mechanism developed over time (modern shoji can be moved with one finger). Formerly, the grooves were made by dobumizo (どぶ溝), nailing strips of wood to the kamoi (lintel) and shikii (sill) beams. The grooves were later cut into the beams, using a specialized saw to cut the sides, a chisel to remove the waste, and specialized groove planes to smooth. A shakuri kanna (plow plane) was used to smooth the bottom of the groove, and a wakitori kanna for the sides of the groove (these planes also became more elaborate, later adding screw adjustments and other machined-metal refinements). Before hiki-chigai (sliding panels that overlap when closed) became standard in the Muromachi period, hiki-do had a central vertical rail (nakahōdate, 中方立) in the middle of each opening to cover the gap between the panels when they were closed.

In the Muromachi period, hiki-do improved, and the Shoin style of architecture was developed. The rising warrior class seeking to emulate the aristocratic fashions, and the aristocrats, who had lost wealth, could no longer afford Shiden-style palaces. Conrad Totman argues that deforestation was a factor in the style changes, including the change from panelled wooden sliding doors to the lightweight covered-frame shoji and fusuma.

A core part of the style was the shoin ("library" or "study"), a room with a desk built into an alcove containing a shoji window, in a monastic style; this desk alcove developed in the Kamakura period. The Shoin style also made extensive use of sliding doors. In order to fit better against closed hiki-do, support pillars were squared; these were called kaku-bashira (角柱). Suspended ceilings were added, and tatami were used wall-to-wall, entirely covering the floorboards. Tatami dimensions were regionally standardized, and the other elements of the room became proportioned to the mats; standardization of building components reduced waste and the need for custom fabrication, and thus cost (standard lumber, for instance, came in exactly the dimensions needed by the carpenter). Lower-class buildings adopted some of the cheaper elements of the Shoin style, where the law permitted it (class-based limitations were not lifted until the Meiji Era, in the late 1800s). Minka (commoner's houses) rarely used sliding mountings at this time, and generally had only small windows.

A variety of specialized hiki-do were developed (along with intermediate forms). Apart from shoji, there were fusuma, similar but with opaque paper, and maira-do, plank-and-batten wooden doors (舞良戸). Maira-do replaced shitomi-do as rain-protection doors. Initially, the beams between the outer support posts were cut with three grooves; the innermost one for the shoji, and the outer two for mairado-do. This meant that the hashira-ma was generally at least half-obscured, although the other half could be open, shoji-filled, or closed.

In the first half of the 1600s, at the beginning of the Edo period, the outermost groove was moved outside the line of pillars. The wooden shutters placed in this groove interlocked edge-to-edge, and were called ama-do (雨戸, "rain-door"): they were storm shutters, used only at night and in poor weather. To open the building in the morning, each ama-do would be slid along (rotating at corners) to the end of groove, where they were stacked in a box called a to-bukuro (戸袋, とぶくろ: literally, "door-container"). The to-bukuro might be designed to swing out of the way. The inner two grooves remained as they were, but both could now be filled with shoji, doubling the number of shoji in a building. Lightweight shoji could be lifted out and carried away easily. This new structure allowed the entire side of the building to be opened, giving either twice as much light, from an uninterrupted wall of shoji, or an unobstructed view of the garden; gardens changed accordingly.

By the mid-1600s, single-track ama-do had spread, and the ama-do might be placed on the outside of the engawa. The combination of architectural changes marked the end of the shoin style, and the beginning of the sukiya style.

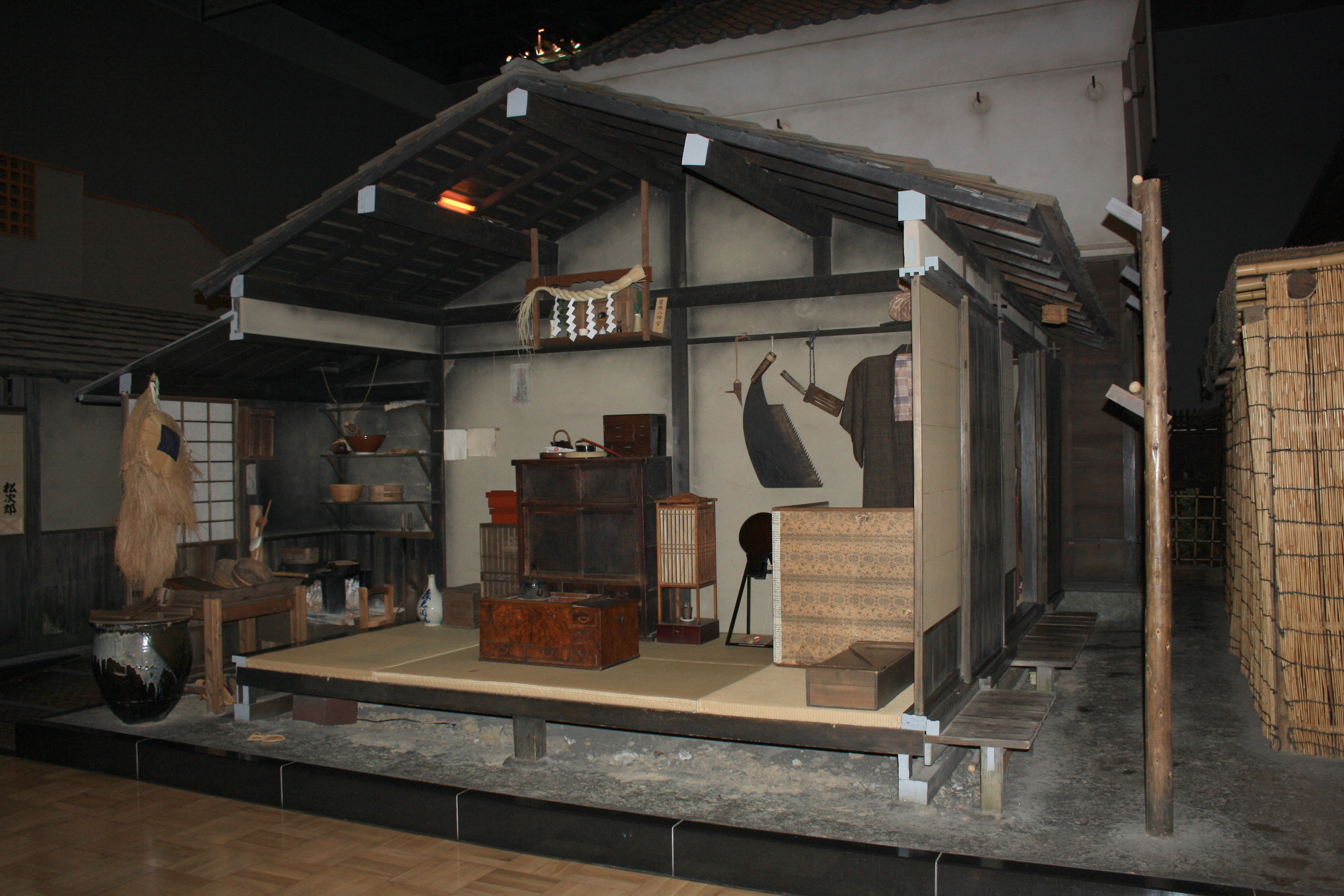
Shoji in a museum replica of a 1×2.5 ken Edo nagaya (長屋, row house). Kitchen to left, second door on right; munewari nagaya had only a kitchen door.

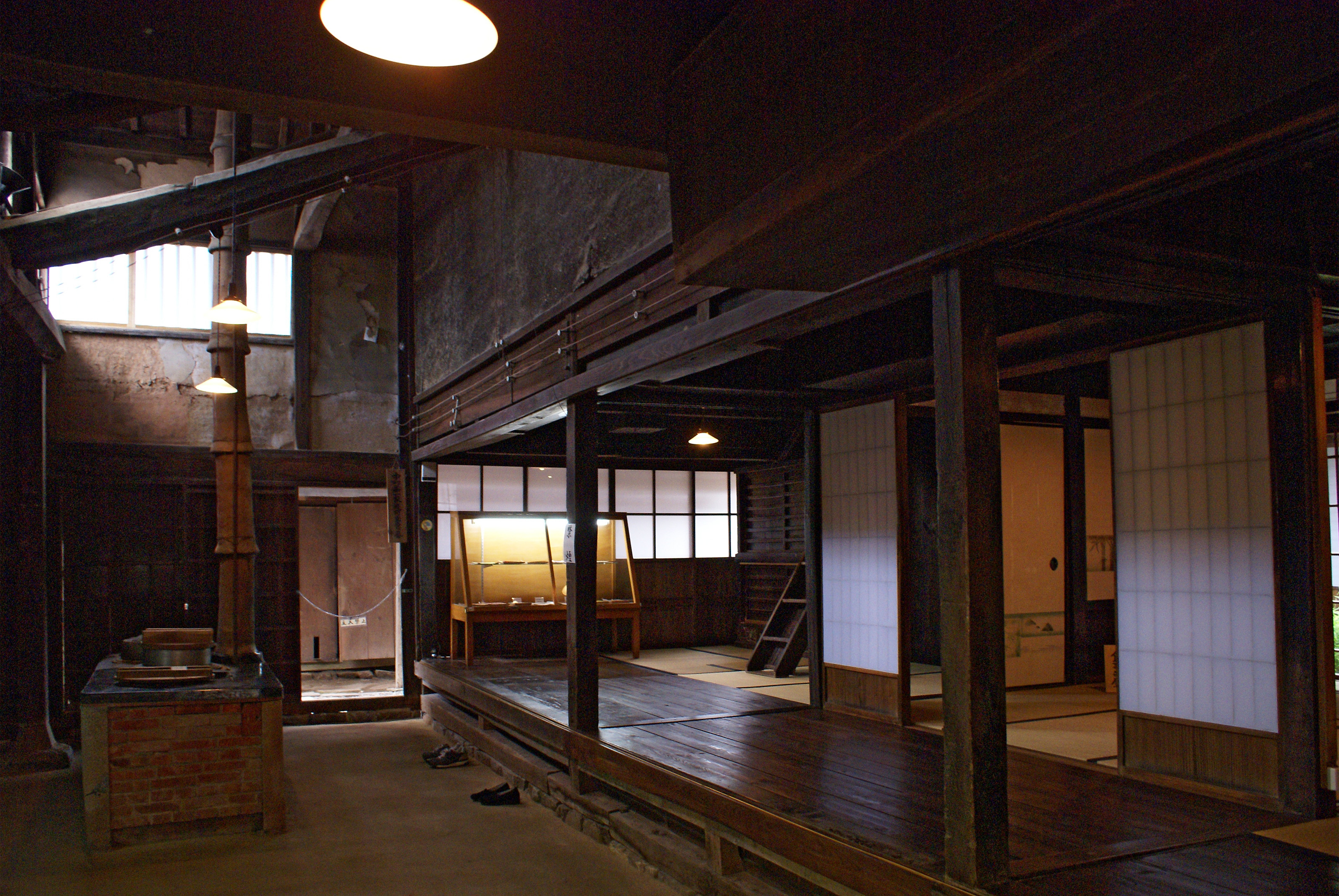
Shoji in a machiya (merchant's house). Light from full-height tōriniwa (通り庭, atrium/kitchen) enters the lateral tatami rooms.

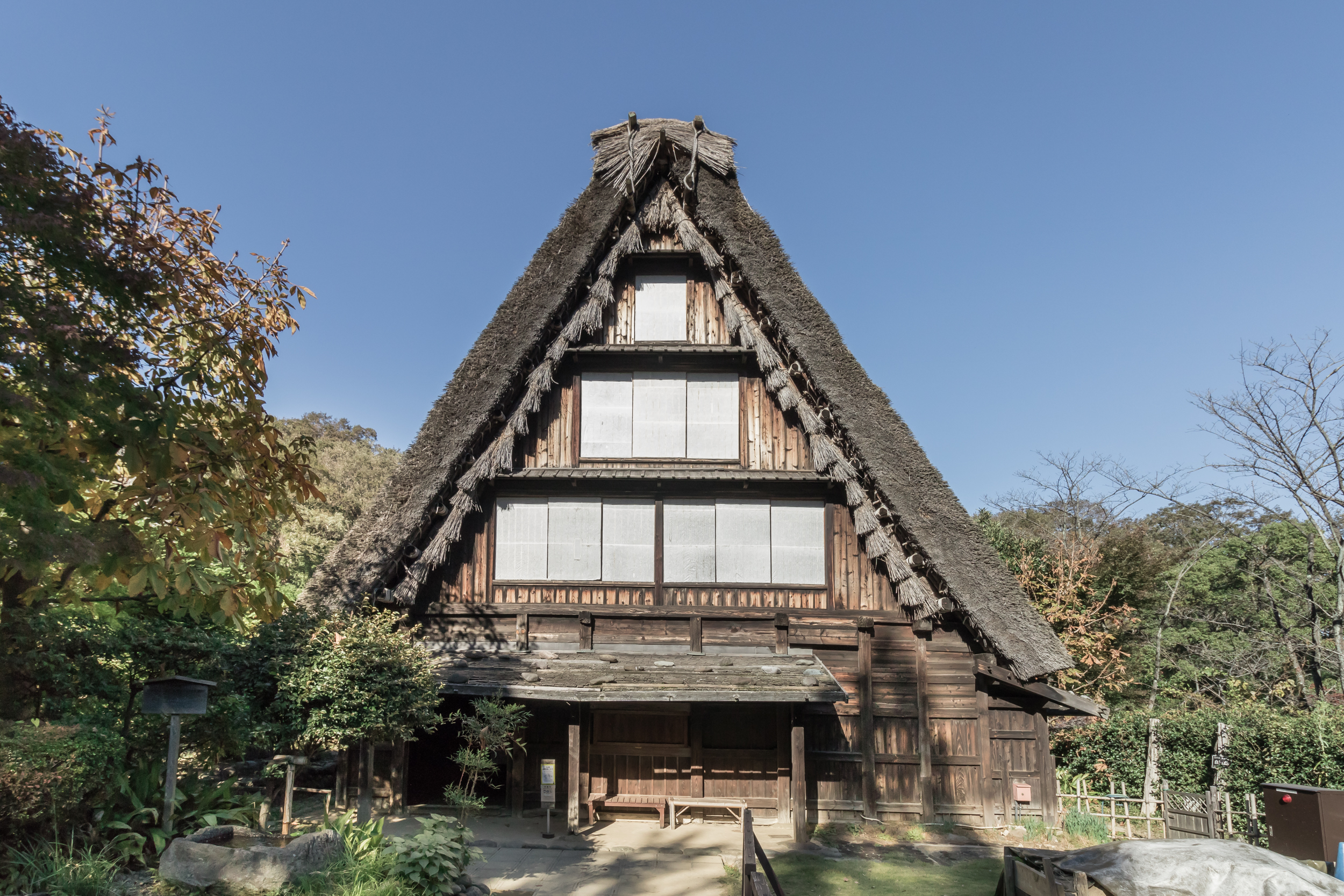
Shoji in a nōka (農家, farmhouse). The attics were probably once used for sericulture.

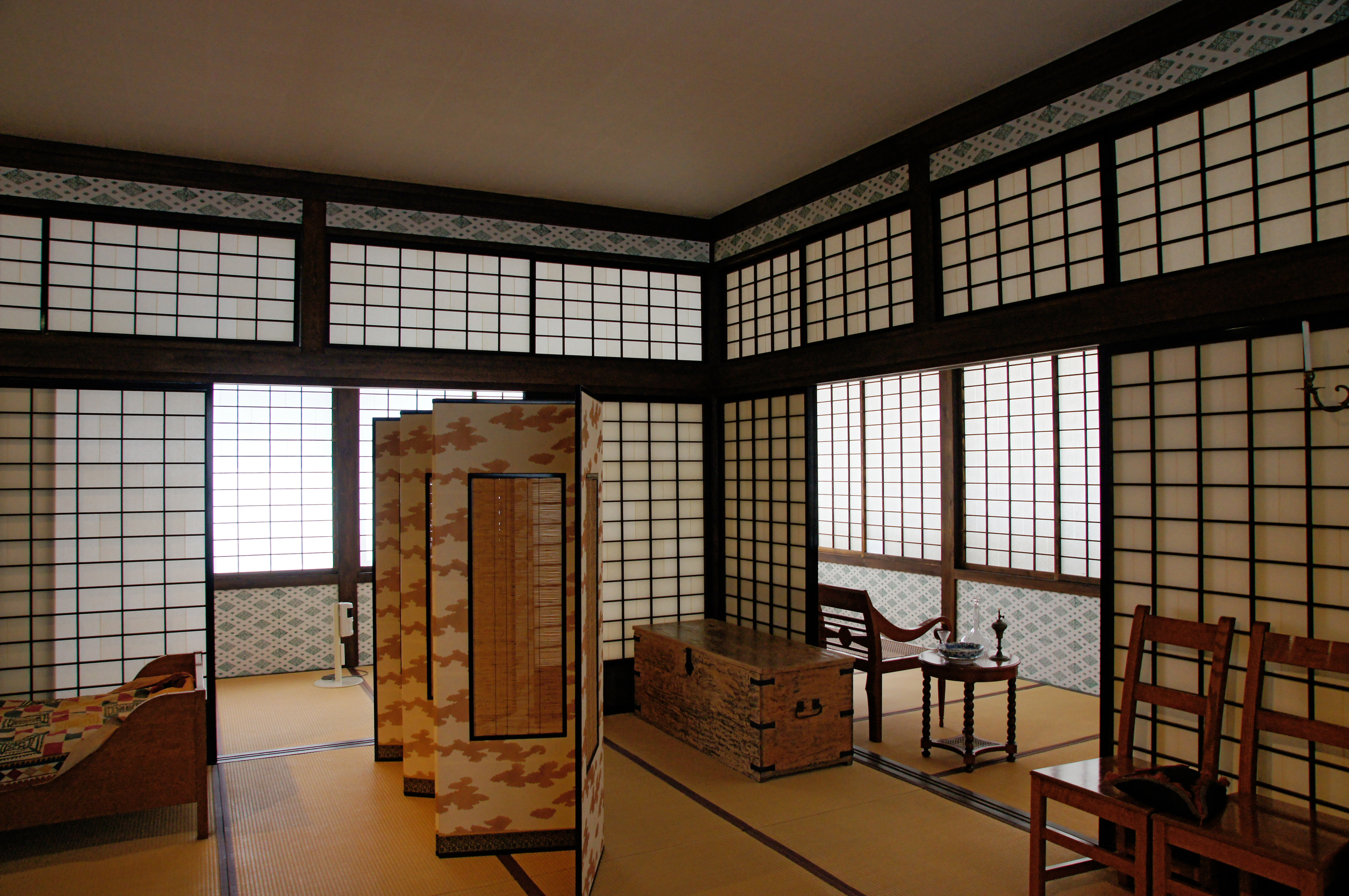
Dutch-Japanese interior from Dejima

Unlike the Shiden and Shoin styles, the Sukiya system was, and still is, used in Japanese buildings of all classes. Simple shoji became fairly cheap (standardization has already been mentioned), so they were not restricted to the homes of the rich (see illustrations).

Paper-and-wood construction is very liable to fire; densely packed nagaya row houses were therefore also known as yakeya (焼く家, やけや, burning houses). Fires were a major problem in Japanese cities well into the Meiji Period; homes (including their furniture and the standardized architectural modules, such as tatami and hiki-do and even floorboards) were made to be quickly packed up and carried away when fire threatened, leaving only the stripped pillars and roof, which could easily be pulled down by firefighters.

Plate glass was introduced to Japan in the late 1800s. It was used in yukimi shoji (see above) and in paperless garasu-do (ガラス戸, Dutch loan-word garasu, glass). Some early garasu-do were divided into panes by mullions, like contemporary western windows (see images).

The float glass technique, which made large panes of picture-quality glass cheap, was developed in the 1950s in the UK. The process was made profitable in 1960, and in the early sixties plants were licensed throughout the world, including in Japan. Japan had developed substantial domestic float glass production by 1965. As 1960s float glass produced large single-pane picture windows in Western architecture, some influenced by the architecture of Japan, it also had an effect on Japanese architecture. Float glass was widely applied to traditional kōshi frames, without much change to the traditional structure or appearance.

In modern Japan, it is fairly common to have garasu-do (all-glass sliding doors) on the outside of the engawa (veranda under the eaves), and translucent shoji on the inside, especially in cold climates. A layer of paper shoji behind a layer of glass helps to insulate the house. Ama-do are still used to protect the glass; for instance, glass doors and shoji may get two grooves each, and ama-do a single additional groove just outside the glass. Shoji are common in the washitsu of modern Japanese homes; they may also be used instead of curtains in Western-style rooms.

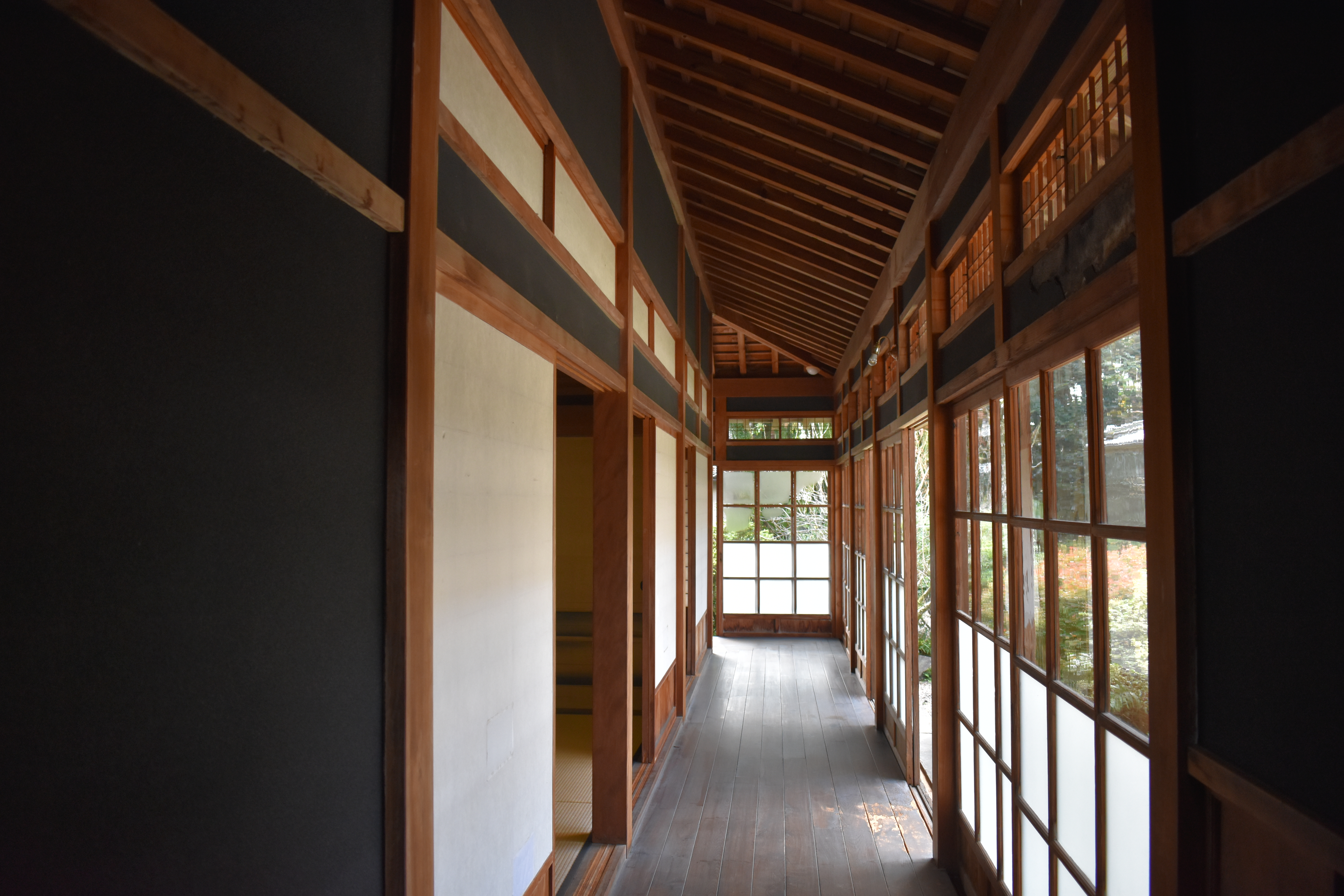
Engawa lined with paper-coated shoji (left, frame on inside) and surrounded by all-glass garasu-do (right). The lower glass is frosted.

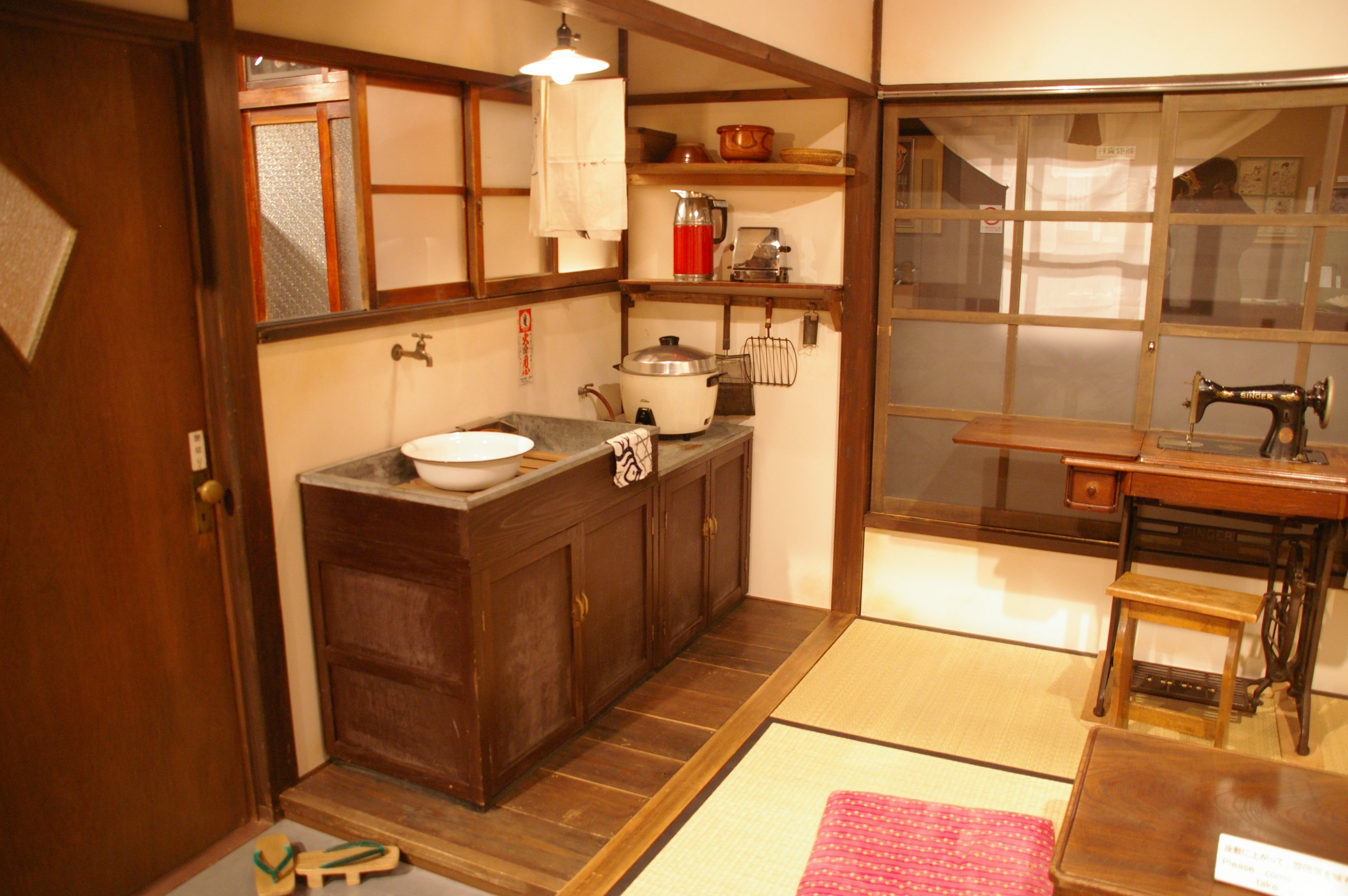
A mid-20th-century Japanese kitchen, with shoji and half-frosted glass sliding doors

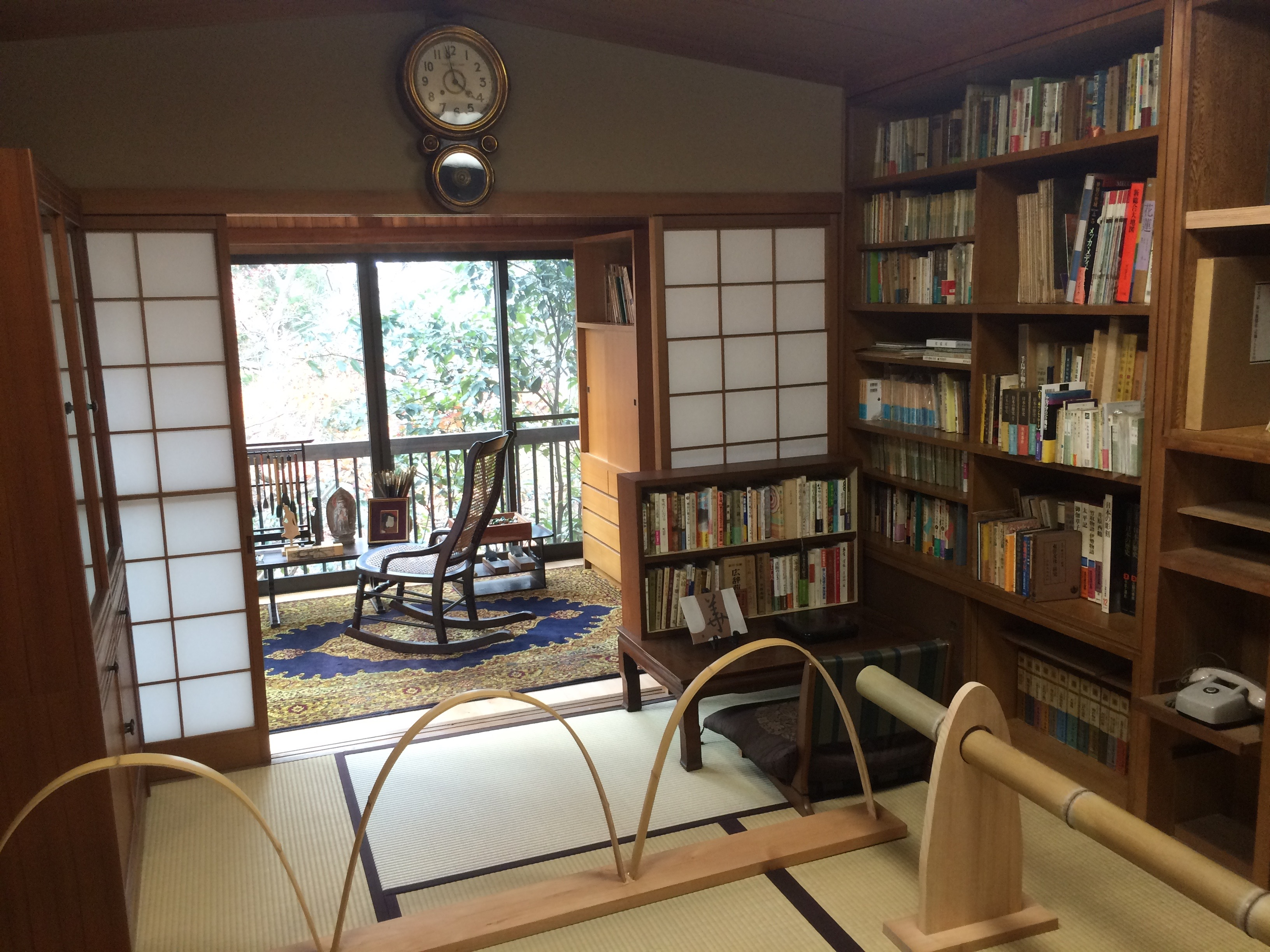
Shoji in an interior with Western-style furniture; note float-glass outer doors

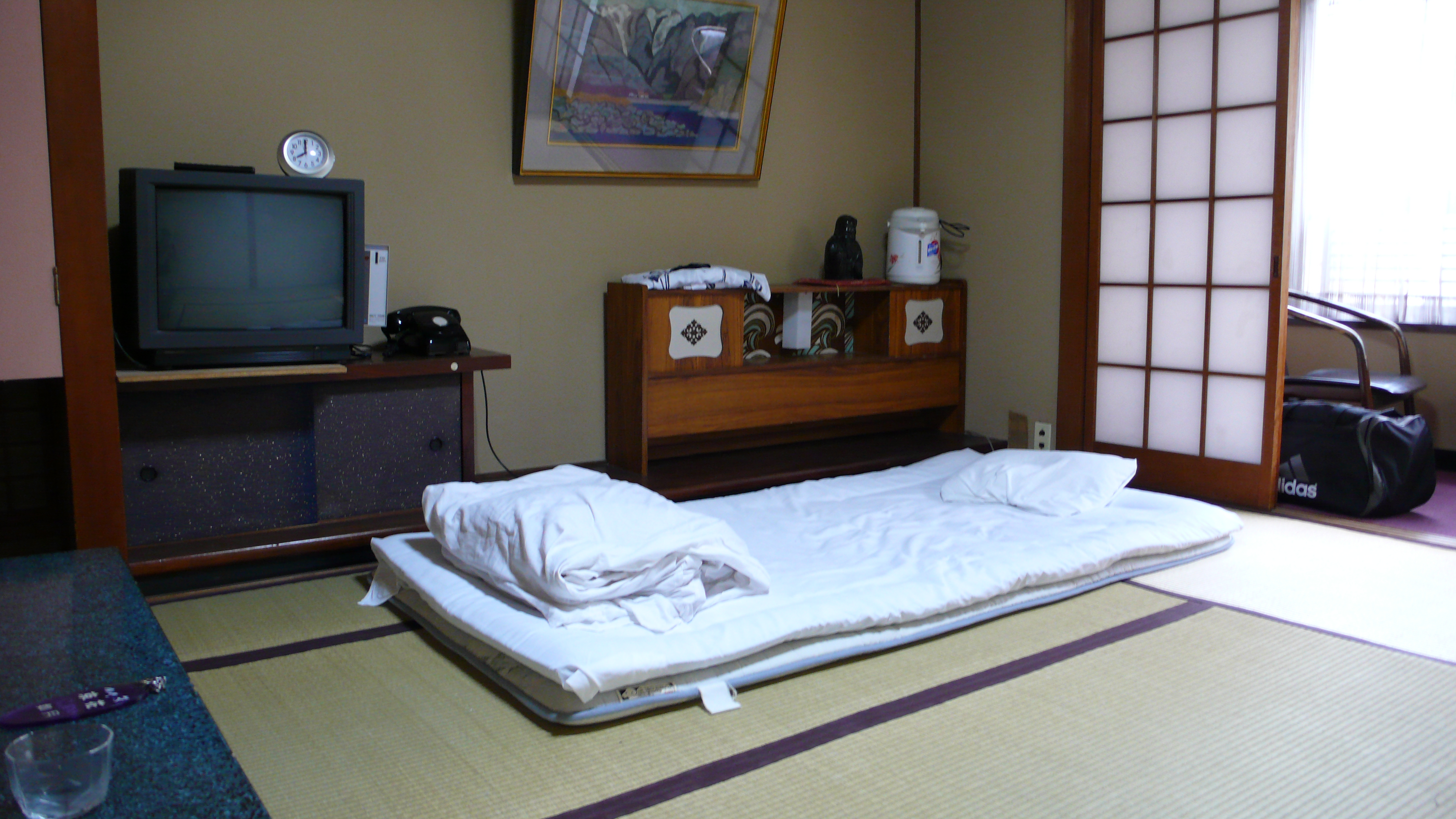
Room with shoji in a ryokan

== Aesthetics and culture ==
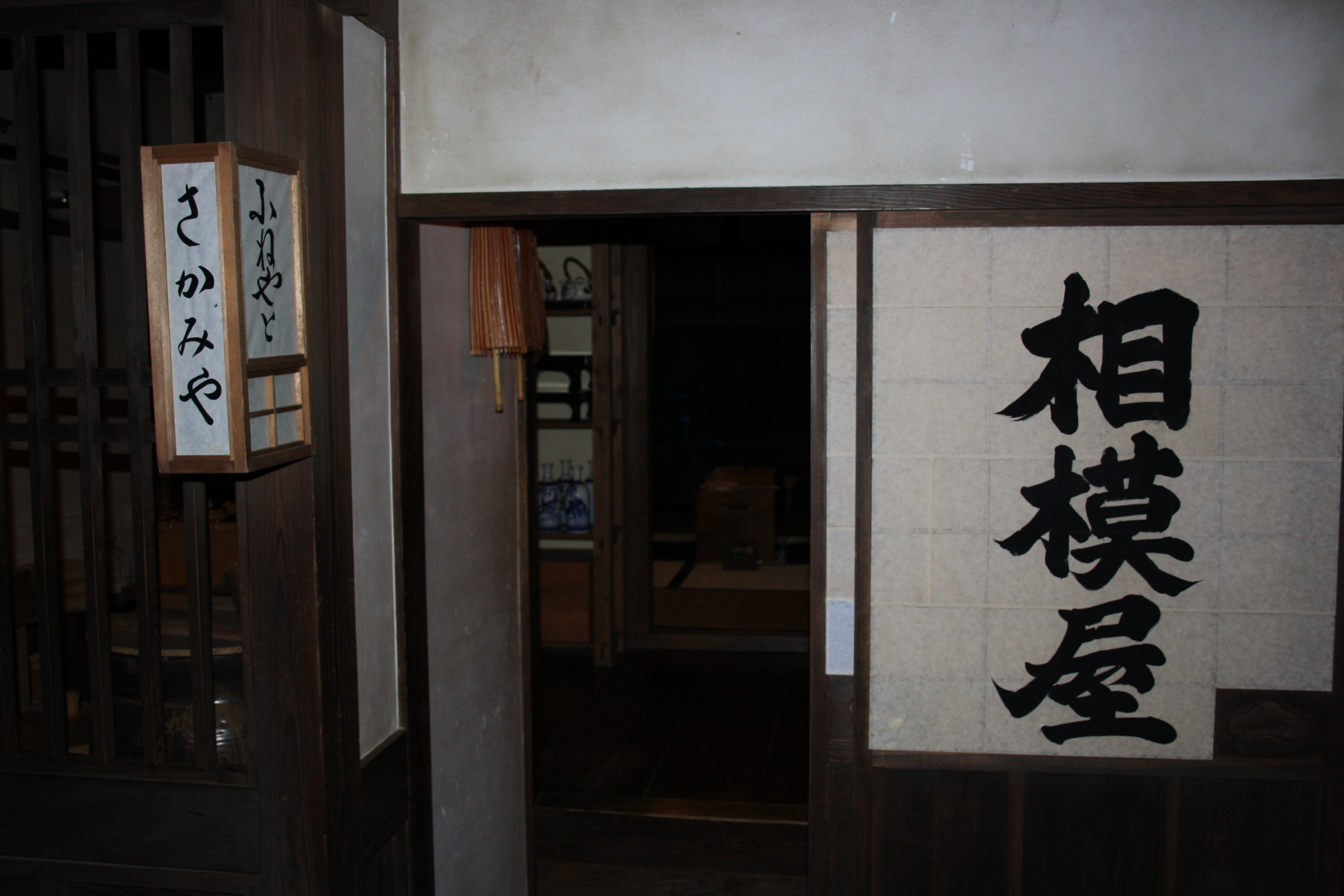
The sign on this shoji reads "相模屋", "Sagamiya". Note hikite (doorpull).

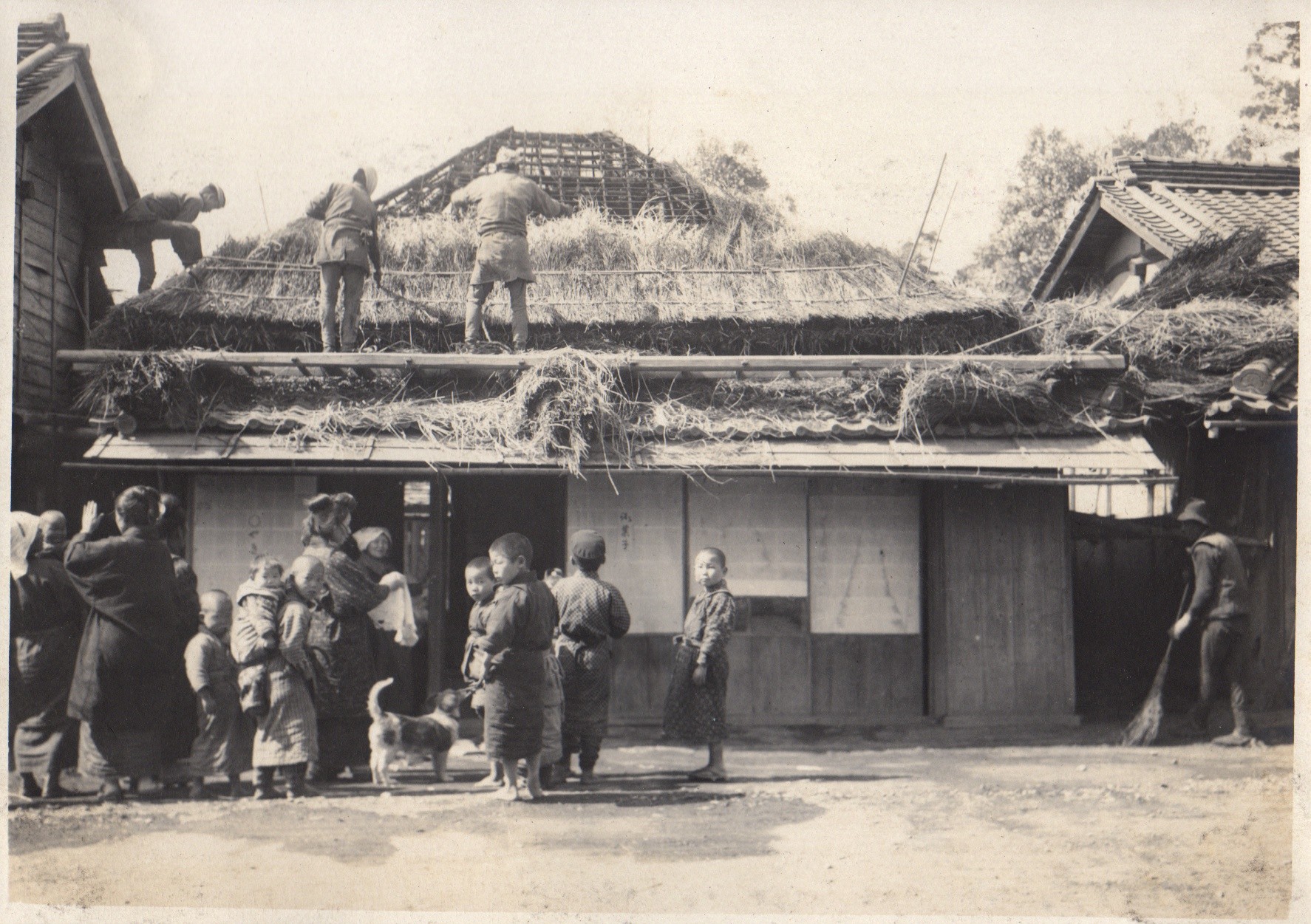
Of six shoji, there is one yukimi shoji, and two with small signage. House can be opened to both the street and the garden.

The silhouettes cast through shoji, and visible on the darker side, are valued for their aesthetic effects. In his book on Japanese aesthetics and architecture, In Praise of Shadows, Jun'ichirō Tanizaki comments on the role of shoji in the interaction of light and shadows. Shoji also filter the outside light. How light is brought inside a traditional building, and what kind of light, is considered an integral part of the livability and aesthetics of an interior space.

The ability to slide the shoji aside, and take them out and put them in a closet, means that living space is more spacious, open, and more connected to the garden outside. It also means that rooms can be thrown together for special occasions, so that a small house can host large social gatherings. This attribute has been valued since at least Heian times.

Paper shoji can be painted on. While paint blocks the light, shoji were sometimes used for signage (see images).

Portability has encouraged the use of shoji on ceremonial occasions and in theater. A person being thrown through shoji is an action-movie cliché.

== See also ==
- Anidolic lighting
- Engawa (protective veranda)
- Fusuma (opaque version)
- Higashiyama period
- List of partitions of traditional Japanese architecture
- Muntins (glass pane frames)
- Sudare (bamboo screens or blinds)
