= List of partitions of traditional Japanese architecture =

Traditional Japanese architecture uses post-and-lintel structures – vertical posts, connected by horizontal beams. Rafters are traditionally the only structural member used in Japanese timber framing that are neither horizontal nor vertical. The rest of the structure is non-load-bearing.

While fixed walls are used, a variety of movable partitions are also used to fill the spaces between the pillars. They may be free-standing, hung from lintels, or, especially in later buildings, sliding panels (Note: Sliding panels became more common in the Muromachi period, but were used in the Kamakura period (see Shoji#Hashira-ma equipment) and even in the Heian period (see image below)) which can readily be removed from their grooves. Their type, number, and position are adjusted according to the weather without and the activities within. They are used to modify the view, light, temperature, humidity, and ventilation, and to divide the interior space.

The timbers are called hashira, the space between them is called hashira-ma; thus, the items filling the hashira-ma are termed hashira-ma equipment.

== Pictorial overview ==
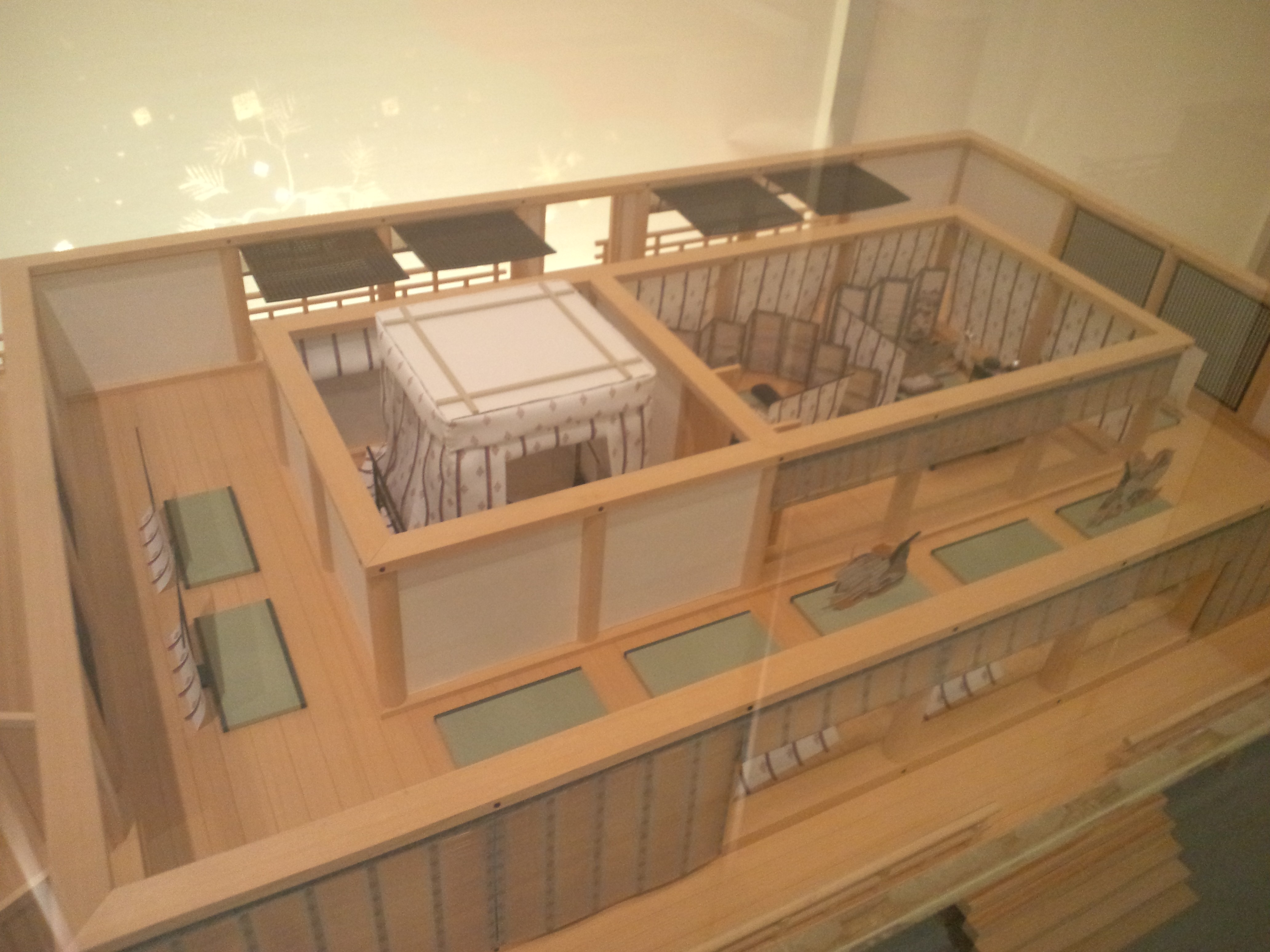
Museum model of the Saikū, the Saiō's palace. An inner square room with plaster walls contains a chōdai sleeping canopy; a second inner room with kabeshiro wall-curtains contains byōbu folding screens; the far outer wall shows horizontally-hinged shitomi shutters, and the near outer wall has misu blinds. Kichō screens stand on the near side of the hishashi outer corridor, and on the short sides of the same corridor.

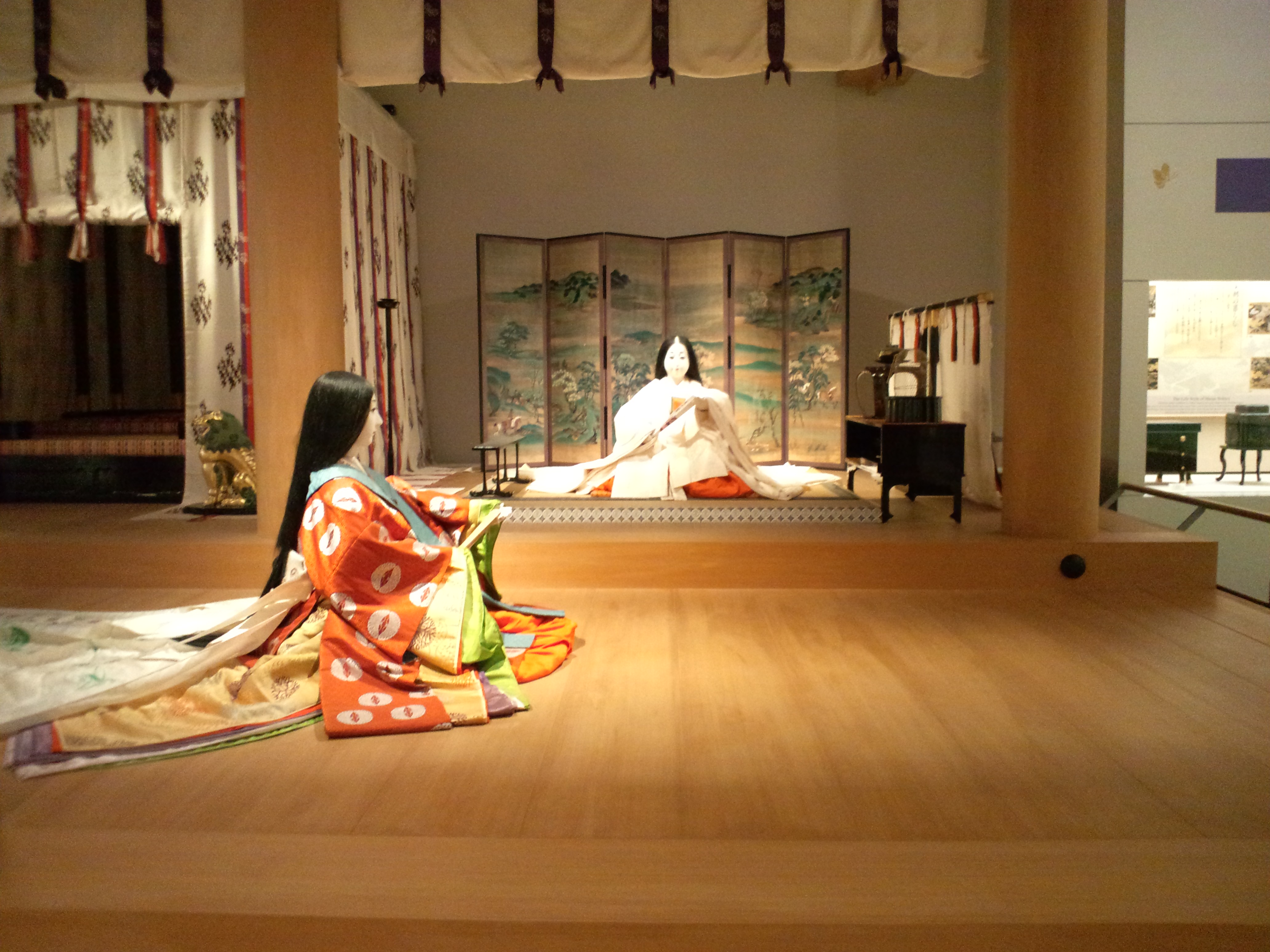
A full-scale model of part of the same palace. The Saiō sits on a tatami dais, with a byōbu behind her, a kichō to her left, and a boxlike chōdai (帳台, baldachin) to her right. Above and before her, a kabeshiro (壁代, wall-curtain) is rolled and tied up. Museum reconstruction of the Heian period's Shinden style.

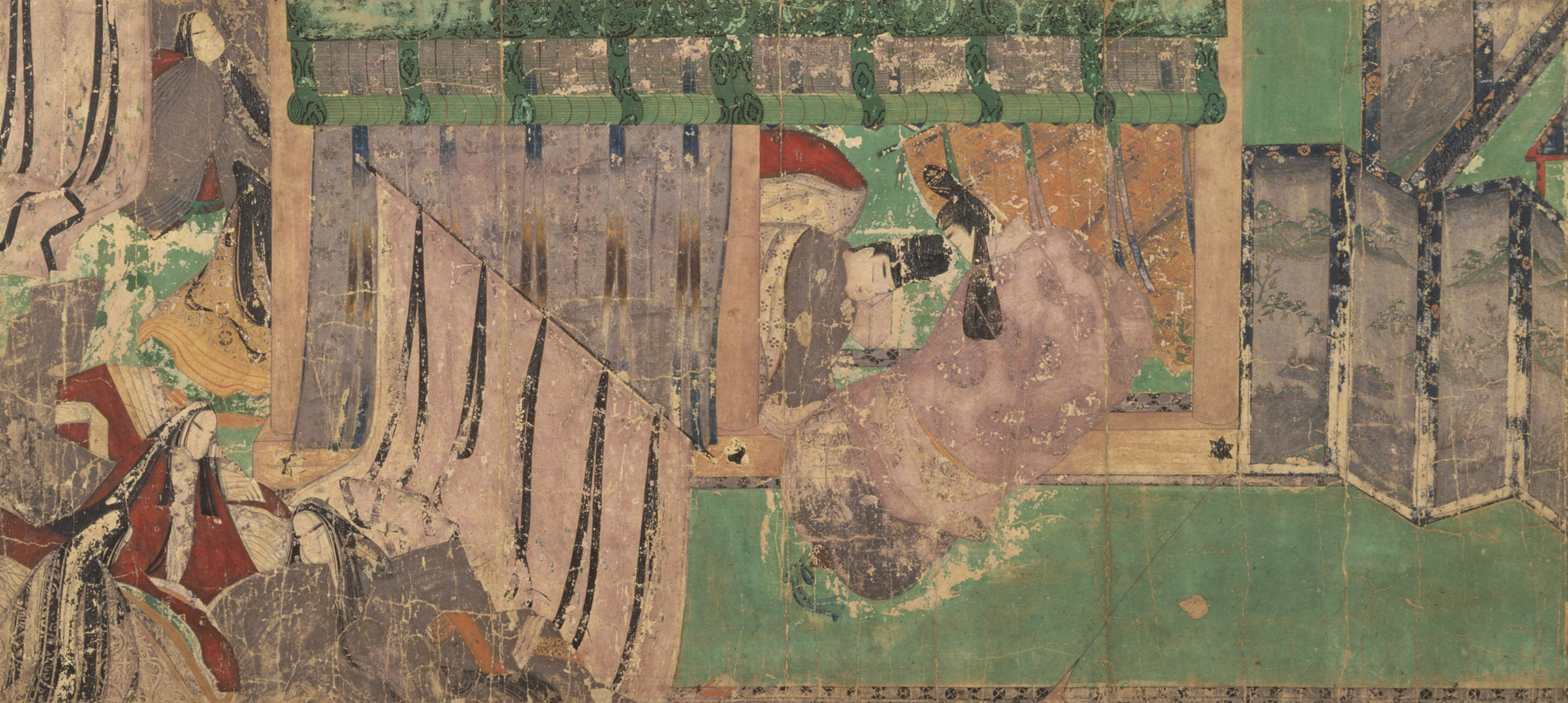
An 1100s (late Heian period) illustration, showing a misu bound in green cloth (rolled, above), a grey kabeshiro with multicoloured streamers (half of it tied up behind the misu hung from the same lintel), three kichō (two white with black streamers, and one orange with multicolour streamers), a byōbu (right), and fusuma (right rear, matching byōbu).

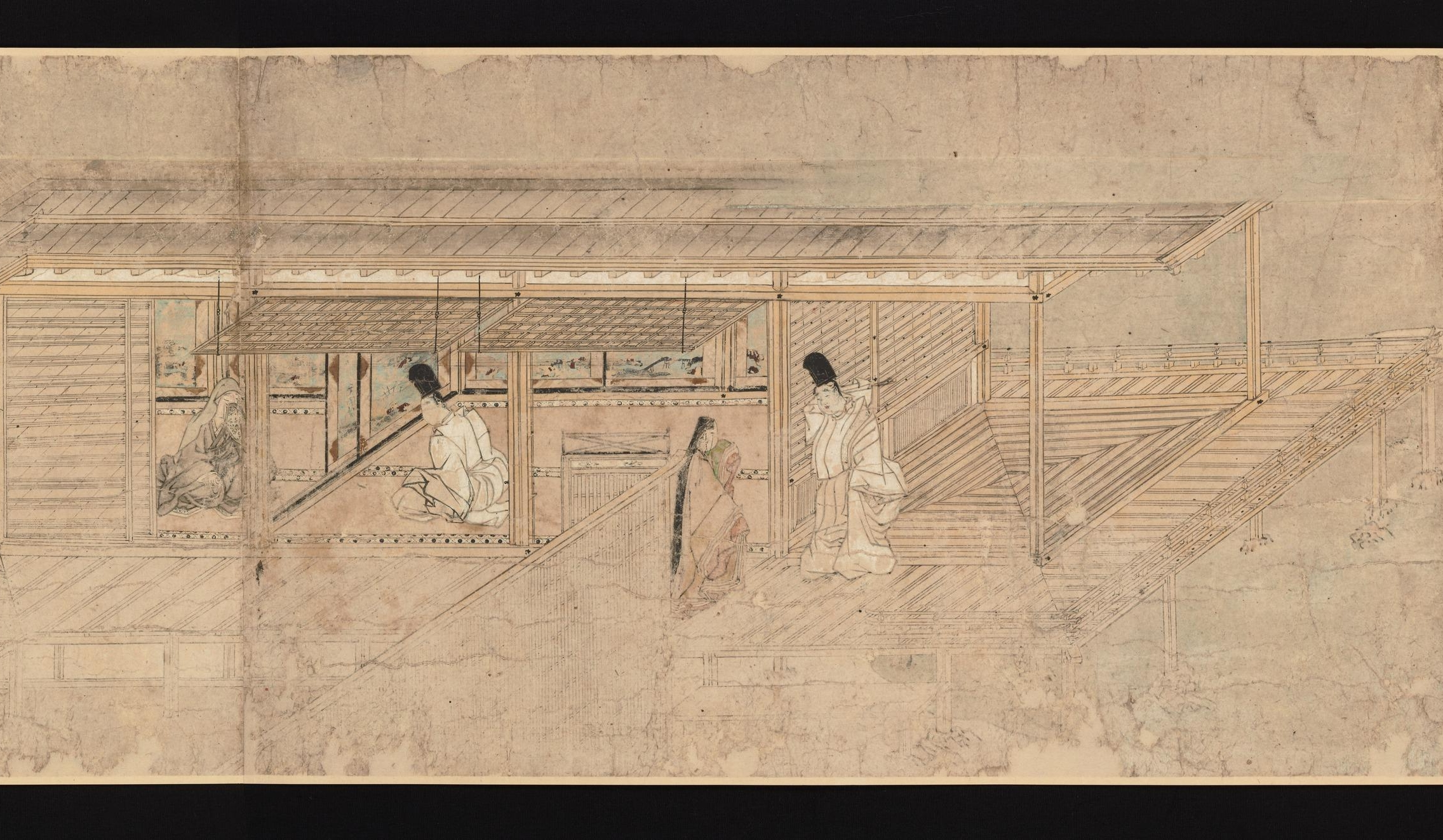
Transition from Shinden style to Shoin style. Between the young man and the seated nun, sliding fusuma; behind them, non-sliding fusuma. On the young man's side, hajitomi shutters, horizontally split, with the upper half held up by hooks. On the nun's side, there are diagonally-planked sliding maira-do. Behind the young man speaking with the maidservant, similar non-sliding panels.

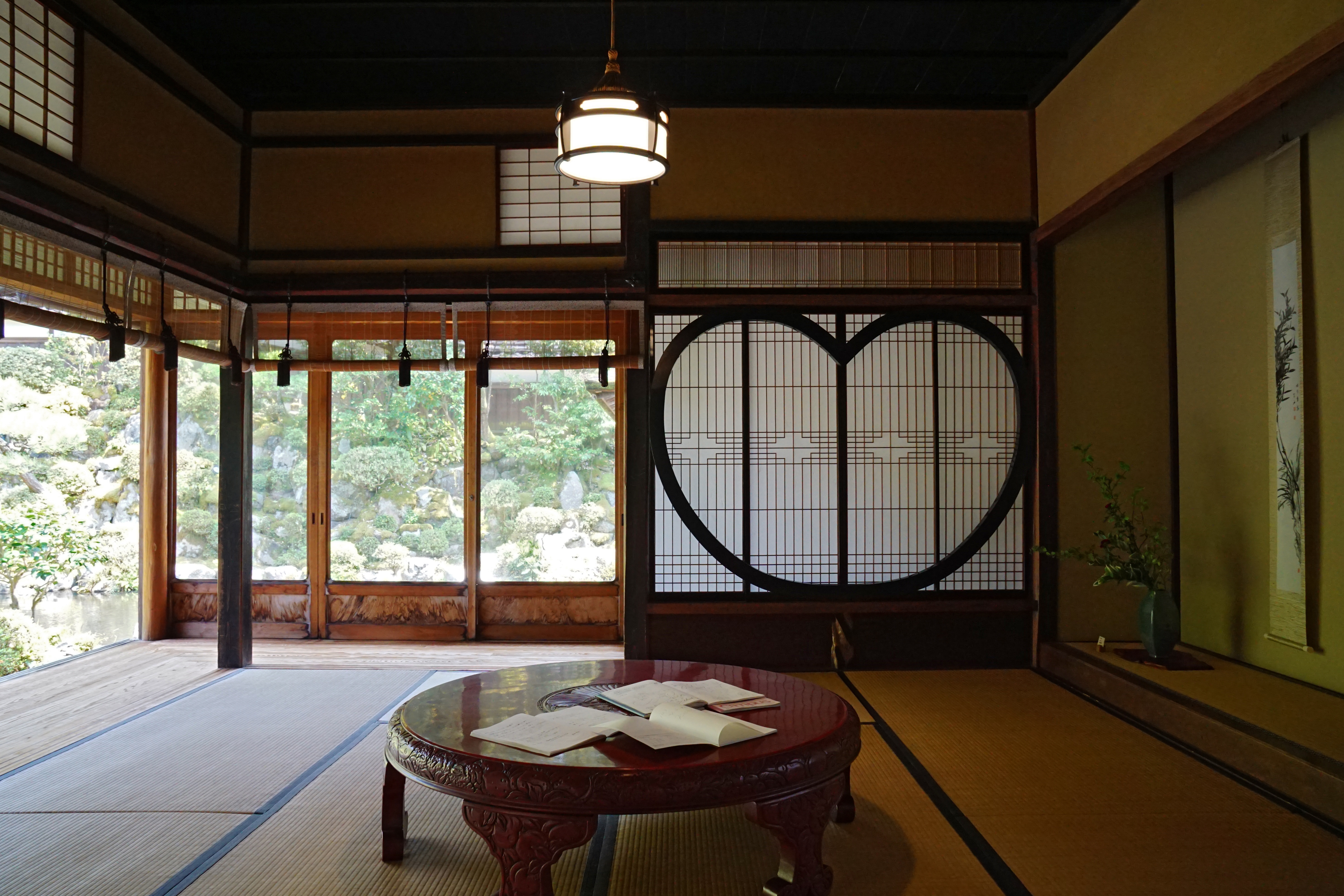
Sukiya style, early 20th century. Garasu-do, sudare, shōji, and plaster walls are visible. The garasu-do use large single glass panes, which would have been extremely expensive before float glass became available in the 1960s.

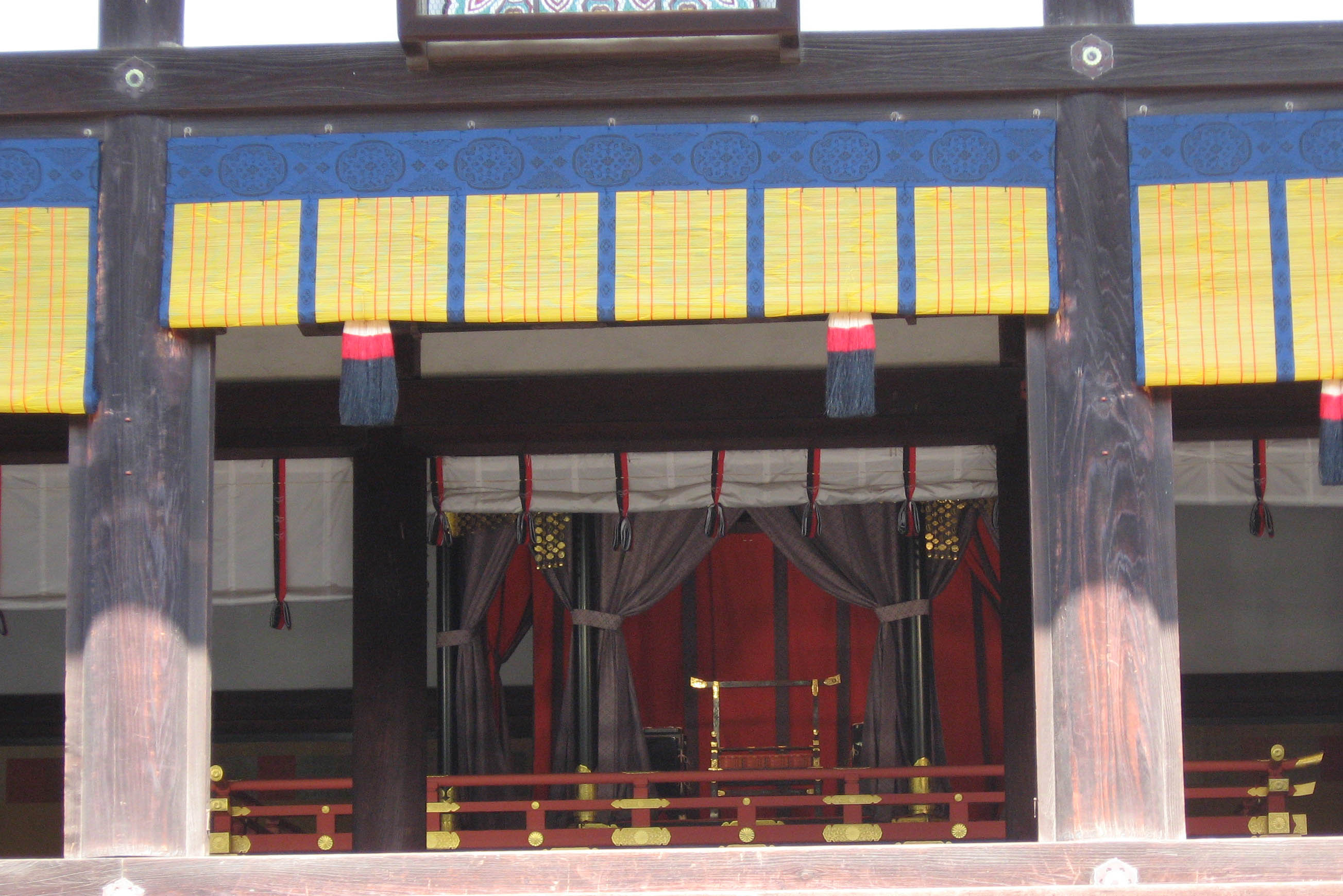
Throne on display in the Kyoto Imperial Palace; from outside inwards, blue-bound misu blinds, pillar slots for shitomi shutters (currently removed), white kabeshiro (wall-curtains) caught up with red-and-black nosuji (野筋) ties, and chōdai (canopy and dais, in red and purple). Older styles often persist in rare ceremonial use.

== By type ==
=== Hanging ===
Type	Photo	Description	Construction	History
Sudare (簾) (and misu, fancy cloth-framed sudare)	more images	Stems are woven into a sheet, sometimes edged with cloth for durability	Phragmites reed, cat-tail stalks, pampas grass, or fine bamboo, held together by a few rows of thread woven around the stems; may be used as a blind, or mounted on a wooden frame to make sudare-shōji.	Used throughout recorded history, still in use.
Noren (暖簾)	more images	A walk-through curtain	Cloth with vertical slits, cord (shown), or cords strung with beads of bamboo or other materials.	Have been associated with urban shop entrances since the late Kamakura period (early 1300s). Still in common use in the 21st century, especially at shop entrances and kitchen doors
Kabeshiro (壁代, lit. 'wall-curtain')	more images	Lintel-mounted curtain, with ties	Made of narrow-loom cloth (tanmono). Similar to a kichō, which however is free-standing. Coloured streamers are called nosuji (野筋), and are ties for tying it up.	Archaic
Zejyō (軟障)	more images	Tab-top flat-panel curtains	Made from narrow-loom cloth (tanmono). May be illustrated or plain, often with strips in contrasting colours (note that in the image, only the interior ones are illustrated).	Used in Heian period. Still used on special occasions, such as the red-and-white zejyō used at festivals.
Jinmaku (陣幕, lit. 'military encampment curtain')	more images	Similar to zejyō, but used as a defensive perimeter around a military encampment	Tab-topped curtain hung on lines, often between posts in a field.	Sengoku and Edo periods. Obsolete.
Shitomi (蔀), including hajitomi (半蔀)	more images	Heavy wood-lattice shutters	Usually horizontally split and hinged (hajitomi), but were occasionally vertically split and hinged. When open, the upper half is held horizontal by hooks, and the lower half is either folded flat against the underside of the upper half and held by hooks, or removed and carried away.	Part of Shinden style. Obsolescent with advent of sliding doors, ~Kamakura period.

=== Free-standing ===
Type	Photo	Description	Construction	History
Tsuitate (衝立)	more images	A free-standing single-panel partition.	Wood, or wood frame covered with cloth or paper, often painted. Feet may be integral, or a separate stand into which a fusuma-like panel can be slotted. Shown is a konmeichi (昆明池) panel, 6 shaku (181.8 cm (71.6 in)) tall; most are shorter seated-height panels.	Dates from the 600s or earlier. One of the oldest types of screen. Still in use.
Byōbu (屏風, lit. 'windbreak')	more images	A free-standing folding screen.	Paper on frame. In Japan, these are rarely left plain; they are usually painted.	
Kichō (几帳)	more images	T-shaped stand with curtain, with ties	Made from parallel lengths of narrow-loom cloth (tanmono).	Used in Heian Japan; all but obsolete by the Edo Period
Chōdai (帳台)	more images	Boxlike baldachin	Box of curtains hung from corner poles, free-standing	Thought to date from 400s. Used throughout the Heian period (794–1185) and, by the high aristocracy, into the Kamakura period (1185–1333). Towards the end of the Heian period it shifted location, and finally became synonymous with an enclosed sleeping room. Characteristic of Shinden style residences. Archaic, except in ceremonial Imperial use.
Ka (架, lit. 'rack')	more images	Garment rack.	A rack or clothesstand, used to store, air and display garments. Often similar to an uncovered tsuitate in structure.	

=== Sliding (hiki-do) ===
Type	Photo	Description	Construction	History
Fusuma (襖)	more images	Opaque lightweight panels, latterly sliding.	Wooden frame covered in opaque paper or cloth, modernly also vinyl. May be painted or printed.	Originated in 600s; made sliding in late Heian period (1100s). In common use in the 21st century.
Shōji (障子)	more images	Translucent panels, usually sliding.	Wooden frame covered in translucent washi paper or cloth, modernly also plastics and nonwoven fabrics.	Similar to fusuma
Ama-do (雨戸, lit. 'rain-door') (See Sukiya style and shōji articles for details.)	more images	Storm shutters used to close the building at night.	Unperforated wooden or metallic panels, usually sliding. Run in a groove outside the pillars, and usually outside the engawa (porch). Stacked in a to-bukuro when not in use.	1600s-present
Garasu-do (wiktionary:ガラス戸; lit. "glass door") See shoji article for limited details.	more images	Glass panels	Mullioned or single-pane. Often found as sliding doors in two grooves outside the engawa (porch), but inside the ama-do. Also used in interiors.	1800s-~1960 plate glass, ~1960-present with float glass
Maira-do (舞良戸)	more images	Plank-and-batten wooden doors	Battens (mairako) may be set crosswise to planks, may cover joins, or may act as a frame into which the planks are set, appearing on both sides.	Popular 1100s-1600s
To-fusuma (戸襖), including sugi-do (杉戸)	more images	Solid wooden sliding doors	Sugi-do made of sugi, and flat. Much heavier than frame doors such as fusuma.	
Kōshi (see Shōji#Frame)	more images	Barred or latticed openwork panels	May be fixed, sliding, or hinged. Modernly, may be backed with glass. The rails are often grouped in clusters; this clustering is called fukiyose (吹寄). A wide variety of traditional patterns exist.	

=== Fixed (walls) ===
Type	Photo	Description	Construction	History
Lath-and-plaster (see also bamboo-mud wall)	more images	Plaster applied over a lattice of wood or bamboo in a half-timbered wall.	Usually multi-layer. Plastered walls were frequently papered to protect clothes. Also used in fireproof kuro. Both mud plaster (often with straw) and lime plaster with fibers and funori glue (shikkui, often used as a topcoat and on floors). The structural timbers of the wall are usually left exposed, but may be covered (oo-kabe), or deeply covered to provide fire protection, as in kura storehouses.	Antiquity to the 20th century; rare in 21st, stucco aside.
Ajiro (wicker)	more images	Multistrand wicker twill	Often used as a decorative covering in the 21st century	
Thatch walls	more images	Vertical thatching	Insulates; historically common in colder areas.	Used on historic properties
Tate-ita		Board-and-batten wall	Vertical boards, the seams covered with thinner laths called battens.	
Shitami-ita	more images	Battened clapboard wall	Clapboarding with notched vertical battens over the boards.	
Bark-and-batten wall (Japanese term?)	more images	Bark-and-batten wall	Vertical sheets of bark, held down with horizontal battens; used as a stand-alone wall or as a decorative facing.	Used on poorer houses in the south of Japan in the 1880s.

== See also ==
- JAANUS; free online Japanese architectural dictionary
- Media related to Partitions of traditional Japanese architecture at Wikimedia Commons
