= Shinden-zukuri =

Japanese architectural style

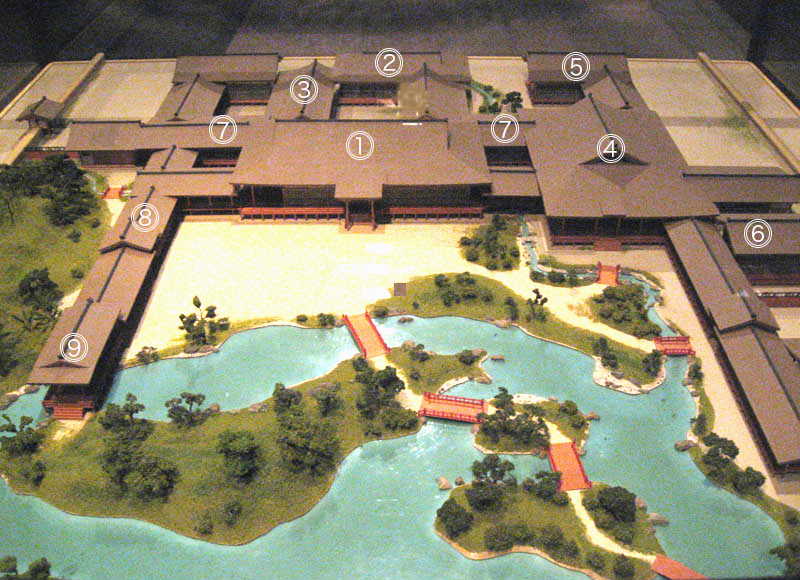
Model of the Higashi Sanjō-dono (ja), a typical shinden-zukuri architectural complex (no longer extant): 1. Shinden (寝殿), 2. Kita-no-tai (北対), 3. Hosodono (細殿), 4. Higashi-no-tai 東対, 5. Higashi-kita-no-tai (東北対) 6. Samurai-dokoro (侍所), 7. Watadono (渡殿), 8. Chūmon-rō (中門廊), 9. Tsuridono (釣殿)

Shinden-zukuri (寝殿造) refers to an architectural style created in the Heian period (794－1185) in Japan and used mainly for palaces and residences of nobles.

In 894, Japan abolished the kentōshi (Japanese missions to Tang China), distanced itself from Chinese culture, and brought into bloom a culture called 'Kokufu bunka (lit., national culture), which was in keeping with the Japanese climate and aesthetic sense. This style was an expression of Kokufu bunka in architecture, clearly showing the uniqueness of Japanese architecture and defining the characteristics of later Japanese architecture. Its features include an open structure with few walls that can be opened and closed with doors, shitomi and sudare, a structure in which people take off their shoes and enter the house on stilts, sitting or sleeping directly on tatami mats without using chairs or beds, a roof made of laminated hinoki (Japanese cypress) bark instead of ceramic tiles, and a natural texture that is not painted on pillars.

This style reached its peak in the 10th to 11th century, but when the samurai class gained power in the Kamakura period (1185－1333), the buke-zukuri style became popular, and declined in the Muromachi period (1336－1573) due to the development of the shoin-zukuri style.

== Structure ==
The main characteristics of the shinden-zukuri are a special symmetry of the group of buildings and undeveloped space between them.

A mansion was usually set on a one chō (町; 109.1 m) square. The main building, the shinden (寝殿; sleeping place), is on the central north–south axis and faces south on an open courtyard. Two subsidiary buildings, the tai-no-ya (對屋・対屋; lit. 'opposing rooms'), are built to the right and left of the shinden, both running east–west. The tai-no-ya and the shinden are connected by two corridors called respectively sukiwatadono (透渡殿) and watadono (渡殿). A chūmon-rō (中門廊, central gate corridor) at the half-way points of the two corridors lead to a south courtyard, where many ceremonies were celebrated. From the watadono, narrow corridors extend south and end in tsuridono, small pavilions that travel in a U-shape around the courtyard. Wealthier aristocrats built more buildings behind the shinden and tai-no-ya.

The room at the core of the shinden (moya) is surrounded by a (one ken wide) roofed aisle called hisashi. The moya is one big space partitioned by portable screens (see List of partitions of traditional Japanese architecture). Guests and residents of the house are seated on mats, laid out separately on a polished wooden floor. As the style developed, the moya became a formal, public space, and the hisashi was divided into private spaces. Since the shinden-zukuri-style house flourished during the Heian period, houses tended to be furnished and adorned with characteristic art of the era.

In front of the moya across the courtyard is a garden with a pond. Water runs from a stream (yarimizu 遣水) into a large pond to the south of the courtyard. The pond had islets and bridges combined with mountain shapes, trees, and rocks aimed at creating the feeling of being in the land of the Amida Buddha.

Officers and guards lived by the east gates.

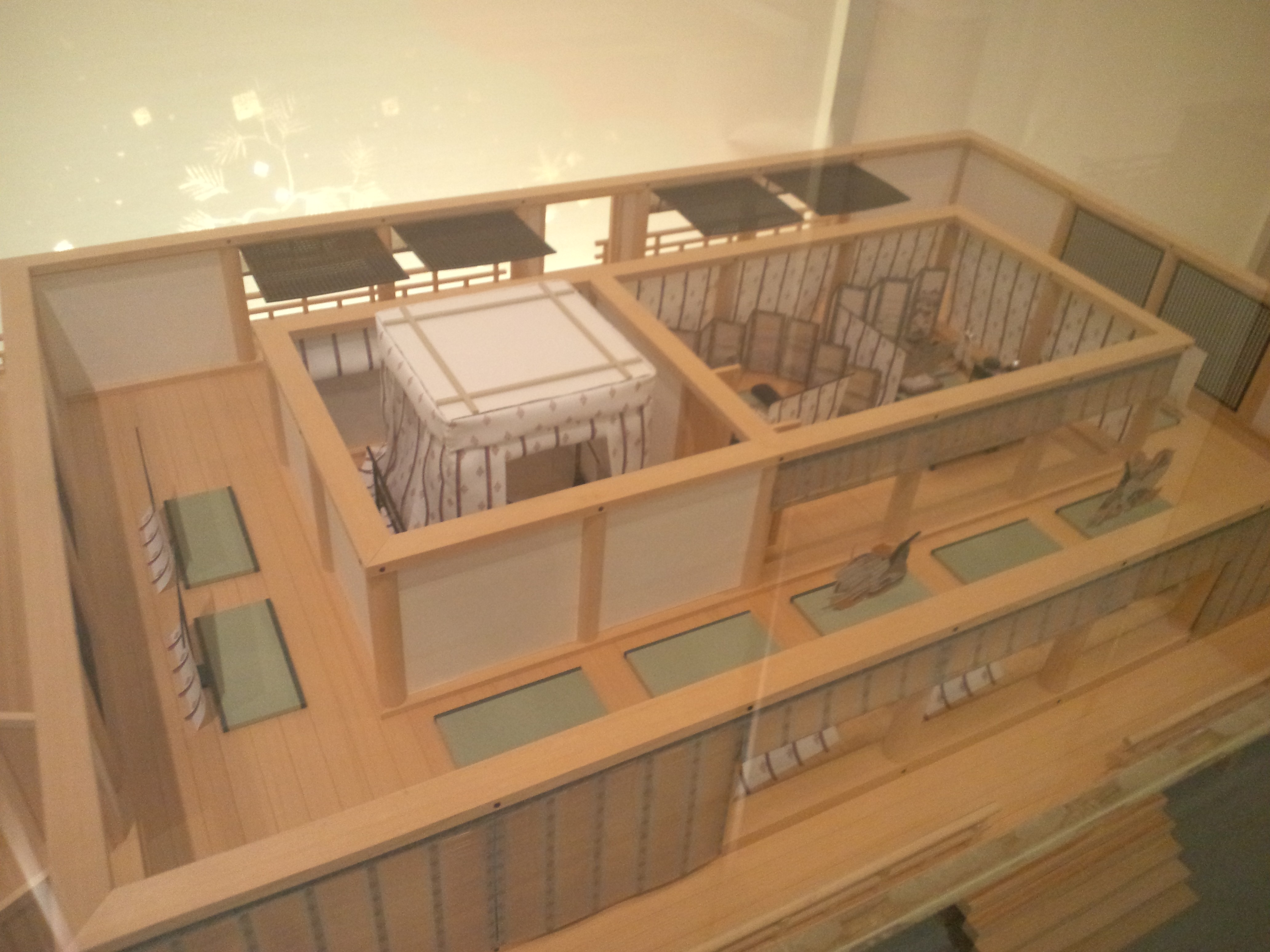
Museum model of the palace of the Saiō. The hisashi surrounds the moya. The moya is partitioned into an antechamber and a nurigome (塗篭), a 2×2 ken sleeping-space with plaster walls, containing a chōdai (帳台, lit. "baldachin"). The nurigome later shrank and moved into the hisashi. The rigid hinged rain shutters on the far side are hajitomi; the rolled blinds on the near side misu.

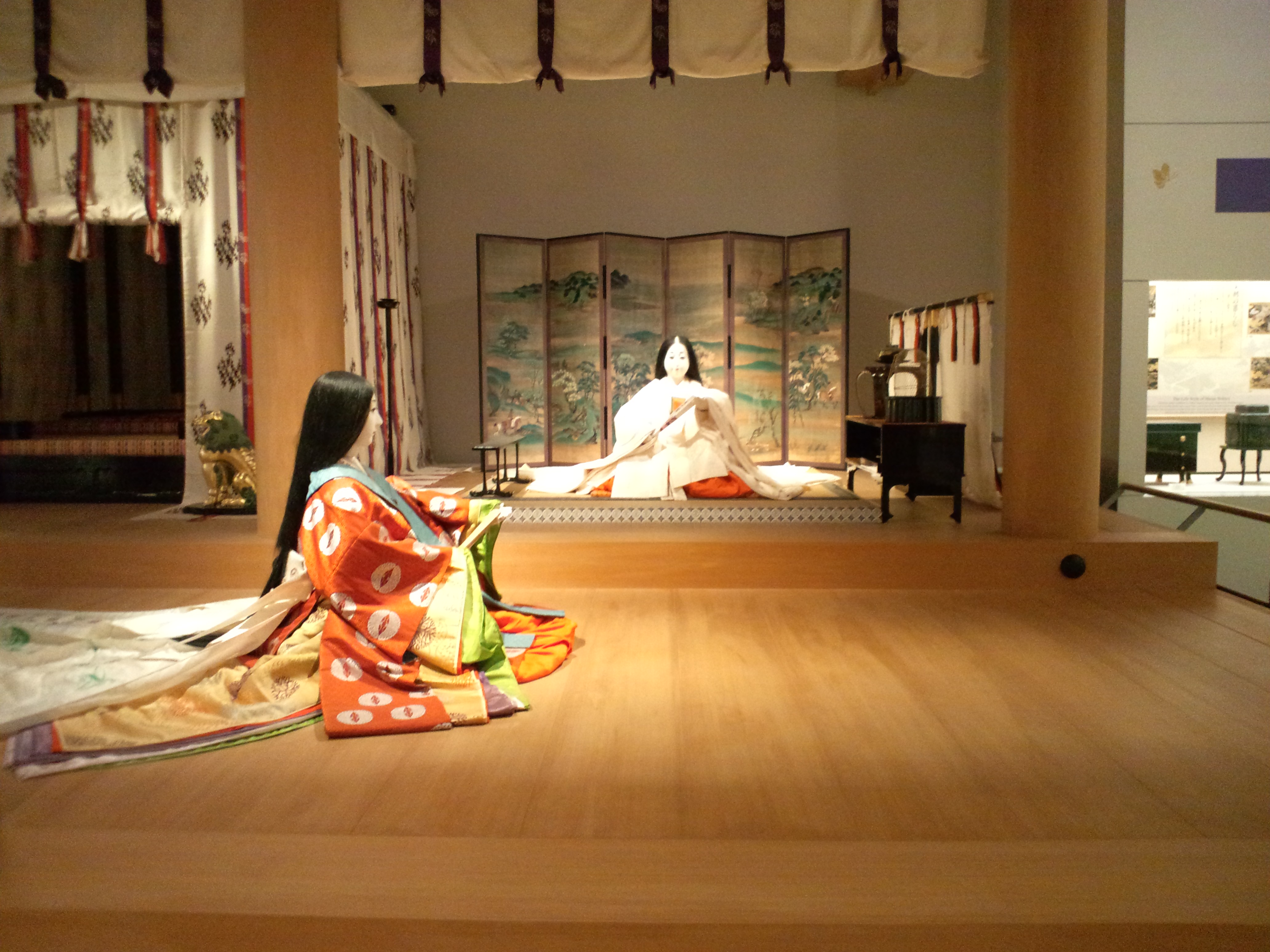
Reconstruction of the interior furnishings of the same building. The Saiō sits on a dais, with a byōbu behind her, a kichō to her left, and a boxlike chōdai (帳台, baldachin) to her right. Above and before her, a kabeshiro (壁代, wall-curtain) is rolled and tied up.

== Other influenced styles ==
=== Buke-zukuri ===
The buke-zukuri was the style of houses built for military families. It was similar in structure to the regular shinden-zukuri with a few room changes to accommodate the differences between the aristocratic family and the military family. During the time when military families rose in power over the aristocrats, living quarters changed. Each lord had to build extra space in order to keep his soldiers around him at all times with their weapons within reach on the grounds in case of a sudden attack. To help guard against these attacks, a yagura or tower was built and torches were scattered around the gardens so they could be lit as quickly as possible.

With the increase of people living under the same roof, extra rooms called hiro-bisashi ("spacious room under the eaves") were built grouped around the shinden. The zensho (膳所 kitchen) was also built bigger in order to accommodate the required people needed to cook all the food for the soldiers and members of the household.

Unlike the shinden-zukuri, buke-zukuri homes were simple and practical, keeping away from the submersion into art and beauty that led to the downfall of the Heian court. Rooms characteristic of a buke-zukuri home are as follows:

- Dei (出居, reception room)
- Saikusho (細工所, armory)
- Tsubone (局, a shared place in the mansion)
- Kuruma-yadori (車宿, a shelter for vehicles and cows)
- Jibutsu-dō (持佛堂, a room in which the ancestral tablets and other symbols of Buddhist worship were kept)
- Gakumon-jō (place or room for study)
- Daidokoro (kitchen)
- Takibi-no-ma (焚火間, place for fire)
- Baba-den (馬場殿, horse-training room)
- Umaya (厩, stable)

The buke-zukuri style changed throughout the Kamakura and Muromachi periods, and over times the rooms in a buke-zukuri style house decreased as daimyōs started to use castles.

== Extant examples ==
There are no remaining original examples of Shinden-zukuri style buildings. It is often said that Byōdō-in temple is the existing shinden-zukuri, but according to Byōdō-in, Byodoin is not a shinden-zukuri style.

some current structures follow the similar styles and designs:

- Heian Palace
- Byōdō-in's Phoenix Hall
- Hōjō-ji

== See also ==
- List of architectural styles
- Roman villa
