= Shitomi =

Feature of Japanese buildings

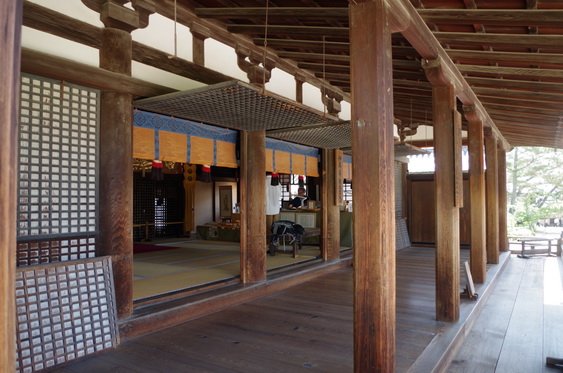
Shitomi. To open, the top half is hooked up. In this type, the bottom half is lifted out (here, it is leaned up against the closed shitomi alongside). Note hooks, both empty and in use, dangling from eaves.

Shitomi (蔀), also called hajitomi (半蔀), are square-lattice shutters or doors found on older-style Japanese buildings. They are characteristic of the Shinden style, and the Heian Period (794–1185). They were used in aristocrats' palaces, and more rarely occur in temple buildings. They were replaced by sliding panels in the Shoin style.

They are usually split and hinged horizontally; when open, the upper shutter was held up at 90 degrees to the wall with hooks, and the lower half could either be lifted out or folded parallel to the upper shutter. This makes it possible to take down the entire wall and just leave the pillars. They are occasionally referenced in modern architecture.

== Extant examples ==
- Ujigami Shrine
- Osaka Temmangu Shrine
- Kinkaku-ji
- Ninna-ji
- Hōryū-ji

== Gallery ==
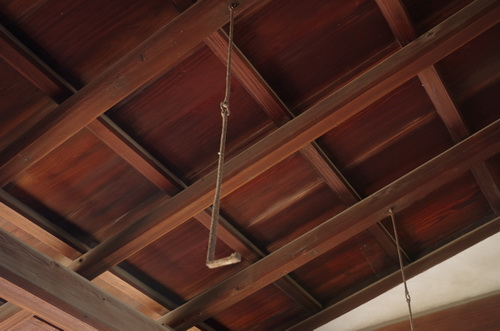
Hook for suspending upper half

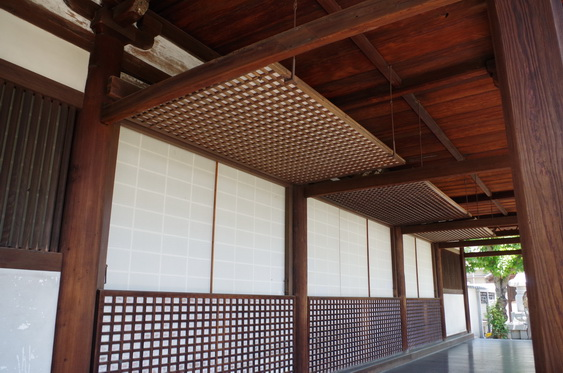
Shitomi, with only the top half opened. There are shōji behind.

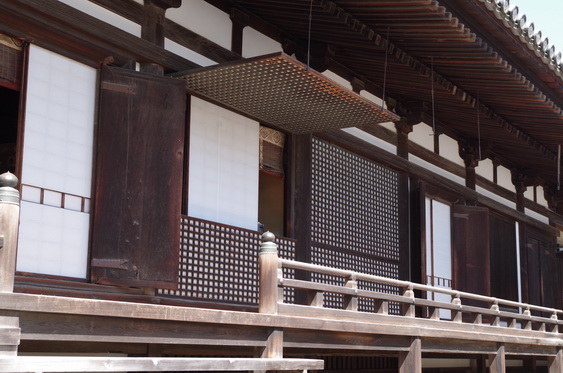
Hajitomi are split, and hinged, horizontally. Center, the bottom half has not been lifted out. There are yukimi shōji behind the hajitomi.

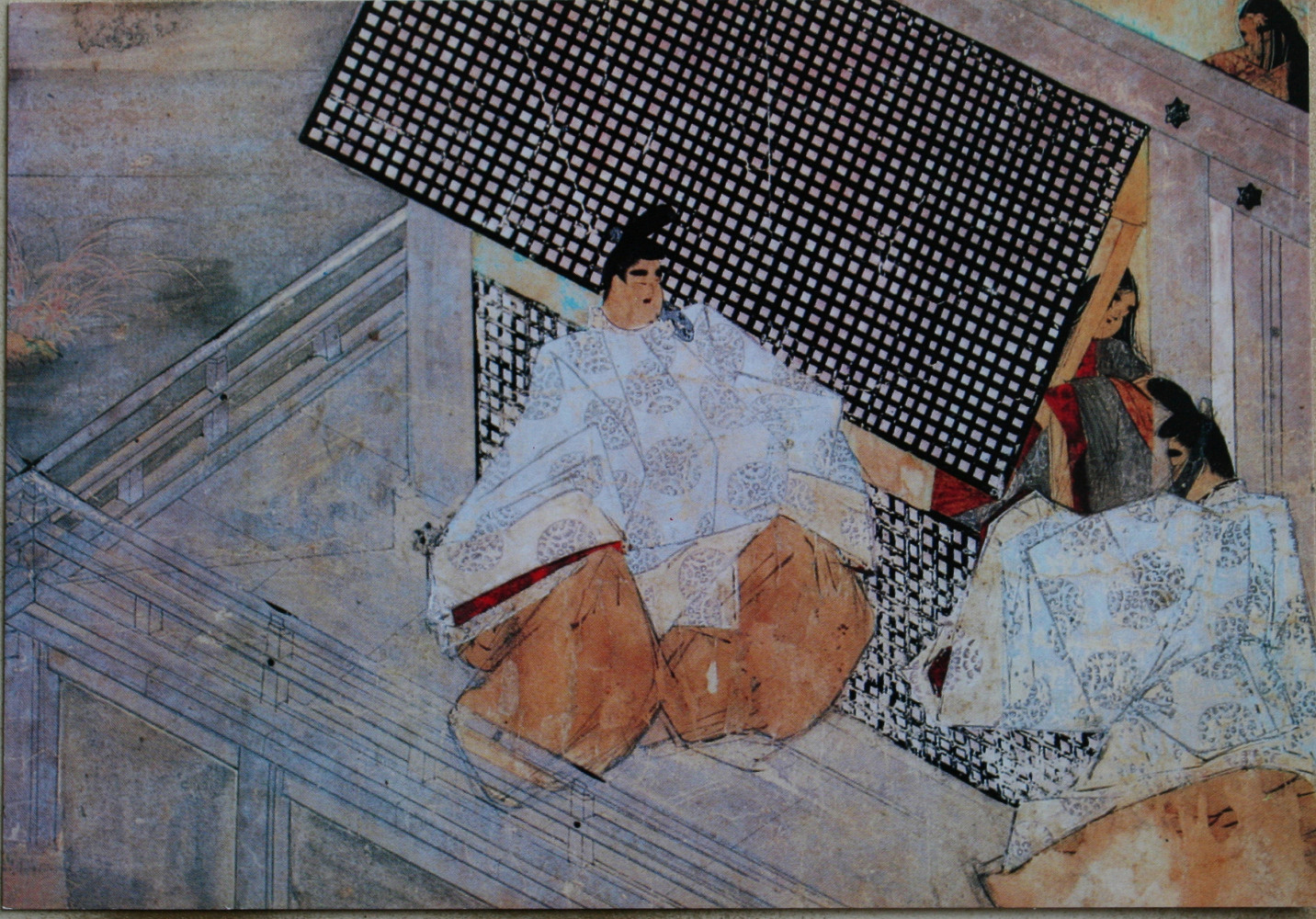
Part-opened hajitomi, 1200s. Note round pillars.

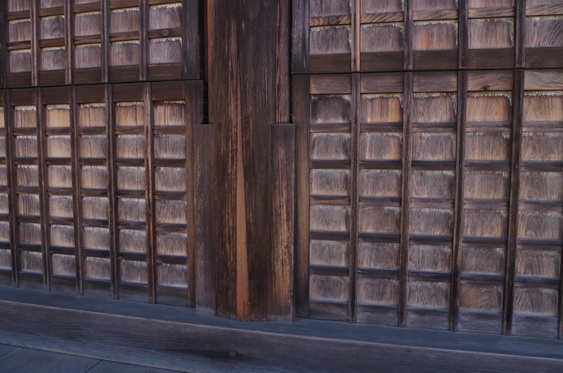
Closed, showing how lower half must be lifted out

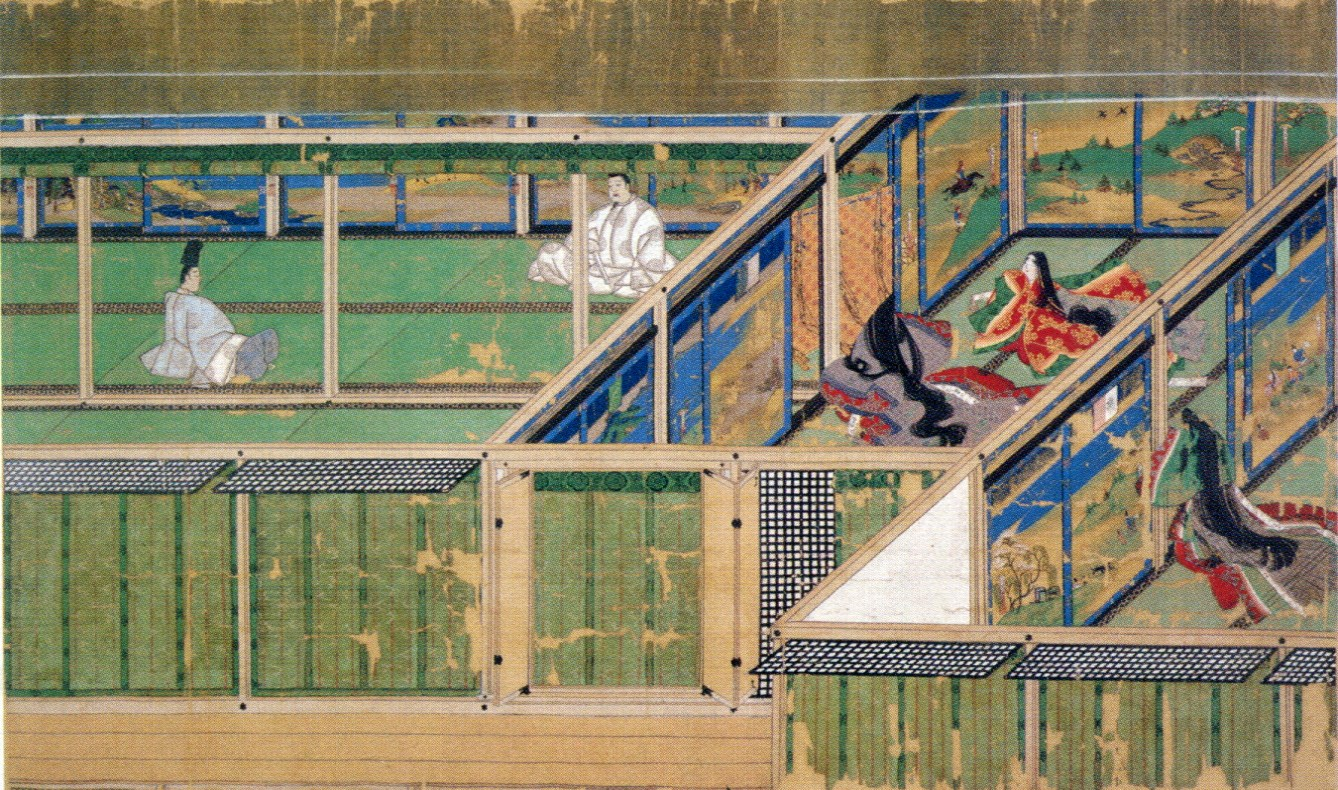
Vertically-hinged shitomi, or folding doors, might be used in a corner. 1309; some highly decorated sliding panels in the interior, green sudare elsewhere.

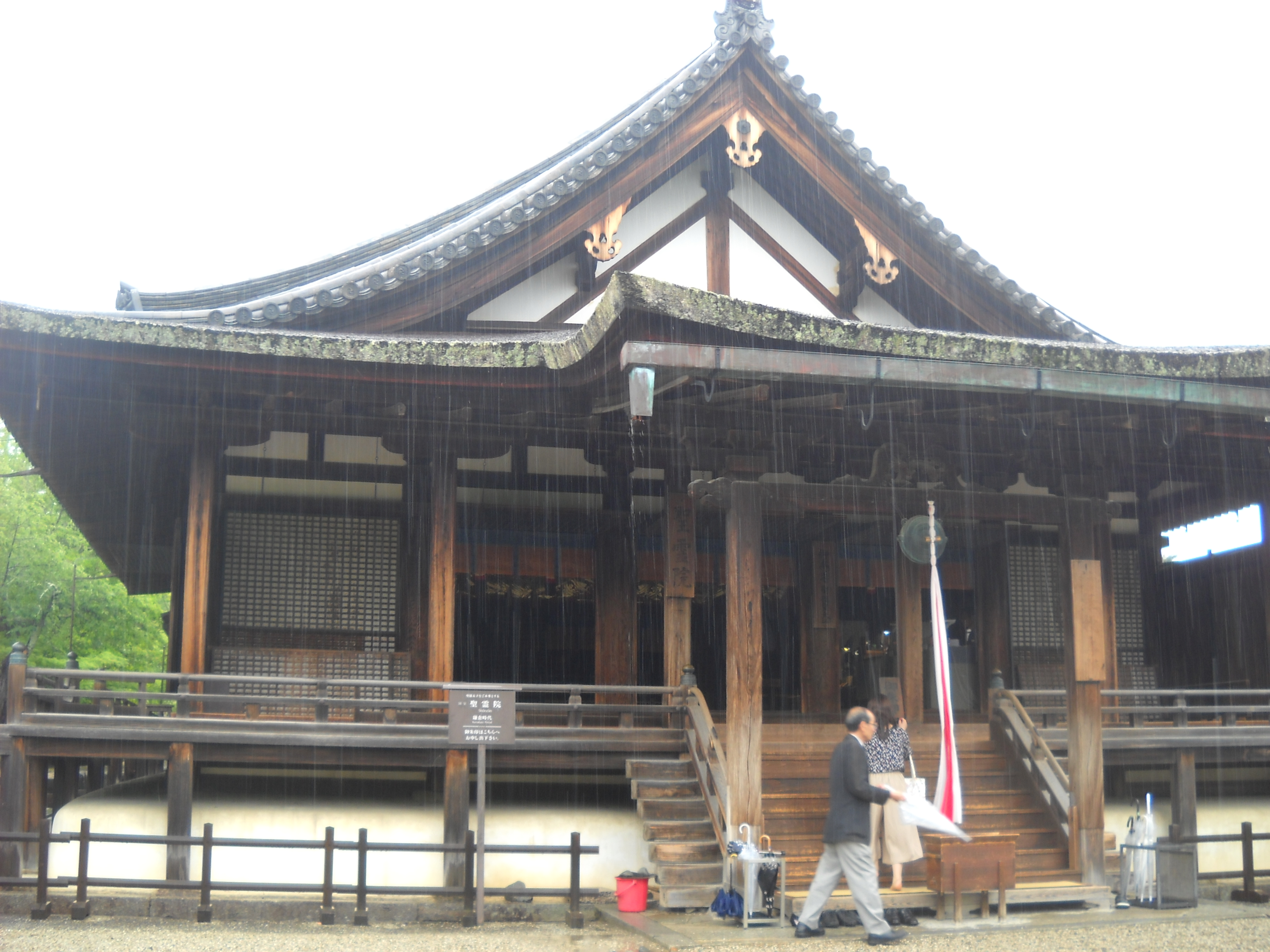
Lower shutters from central three bays (inter-pillar spaces) have been lifted out and stacked against the outermost bays.

== See also ==
- List of partitions of traditional Japanese architecture
