= Fusuma =

Vertical rectangular panels in Japanese architecture

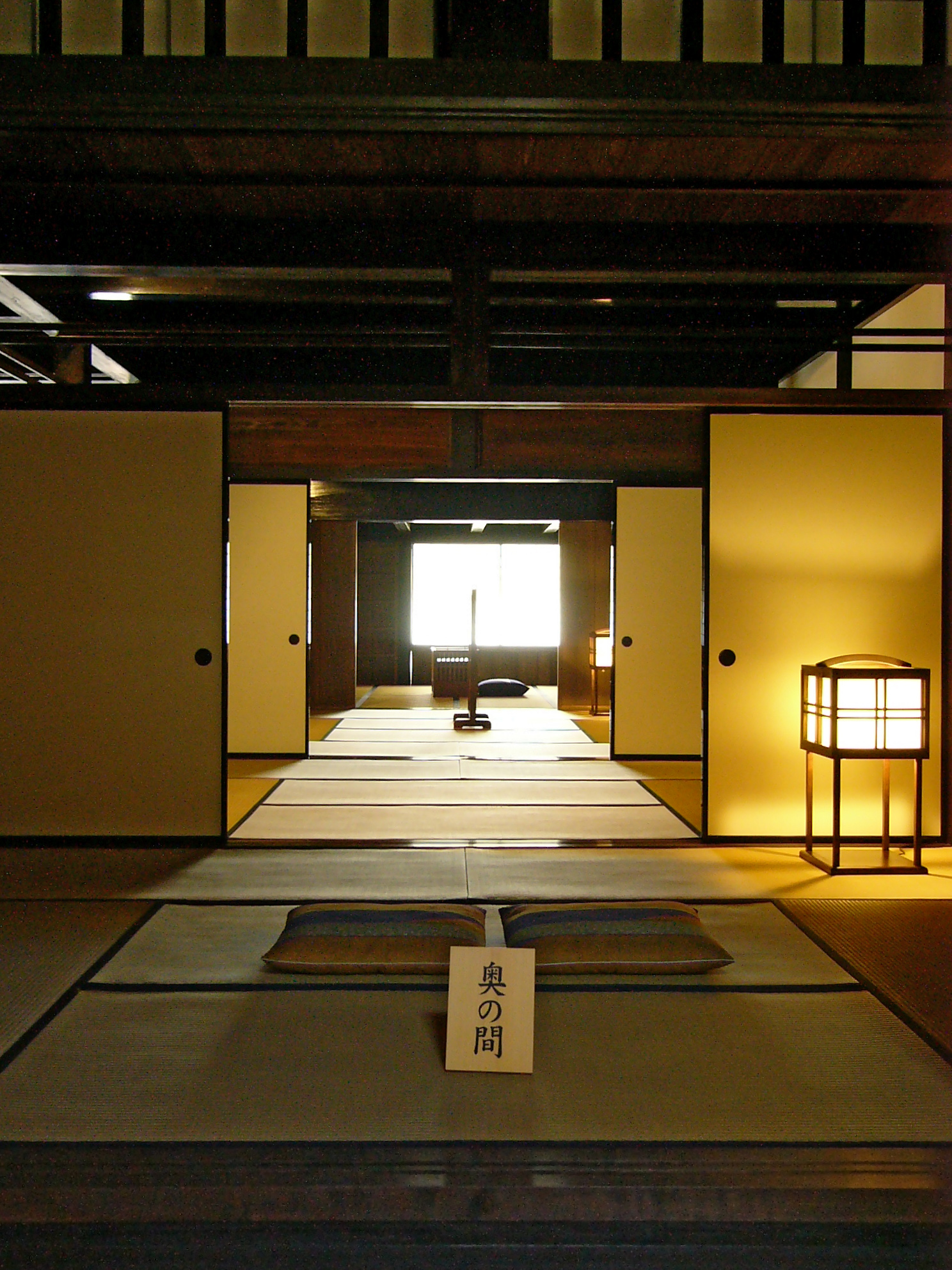
Fusuma

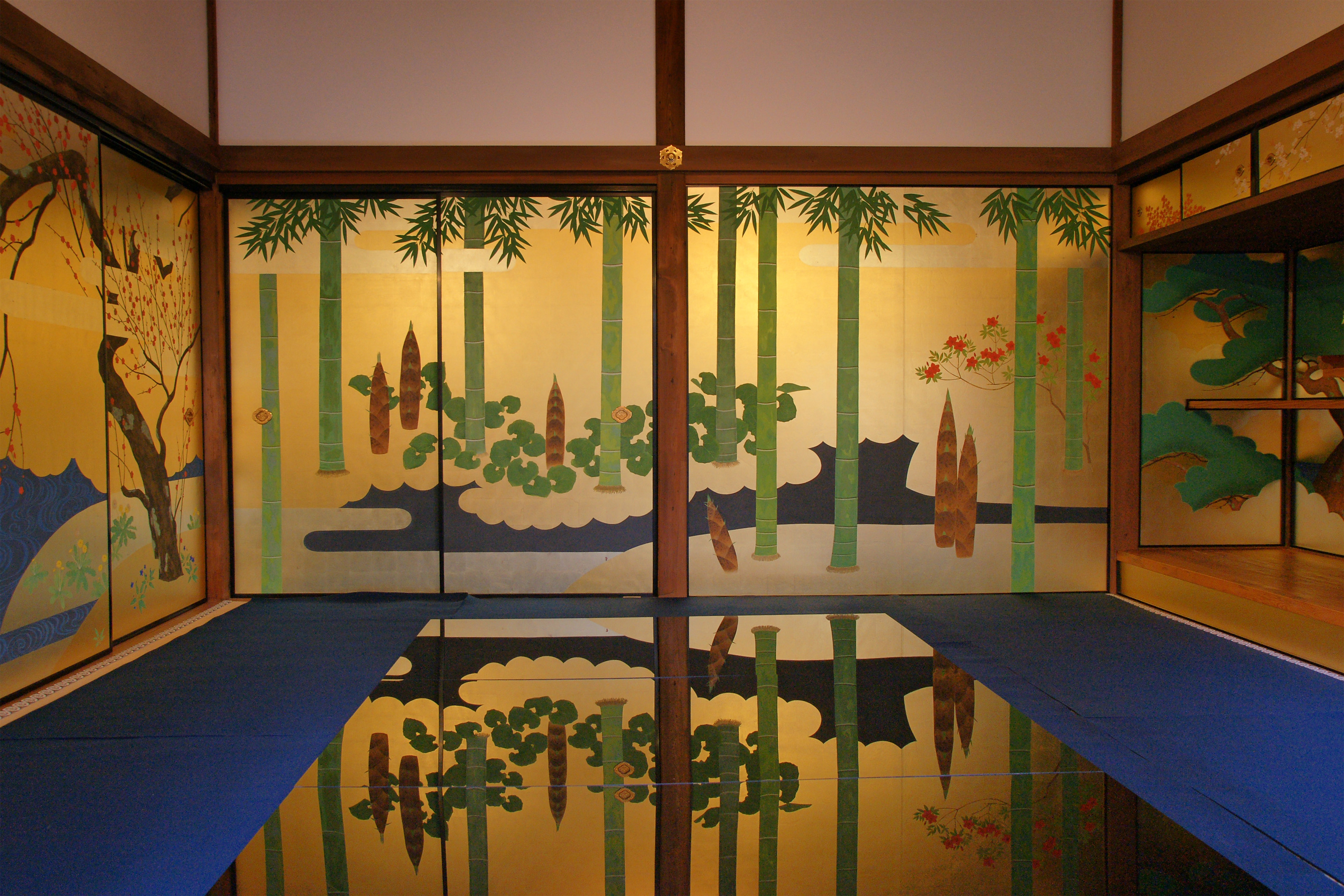
Kin-busuma (golden fusuma)

In Japanese architecture, fusuma (襖) are vertical rectangular panels which can slide from side to side to redefine spaces within a room, or act as doors. They typically measure about 90 cm (2 ft 11 in) wide by 180 cm (5 ft 11 in) tall, the same size as a tatami mat, and are 2–3 cm (0.79–1.18 in) thick. The heights of fusuma have increased in recent years due to an increase in average height of the Japanese population, and a 190 cm (6 ft 3 in) height is now common. In older constructions, they are as small as 170 cm (5 ft 7 in) high. They consist of a lattice-like wooden understructure covered in cardboard and a layer of paper or cloth on both sides. They typically have a black lacquer border and a round finger catch.

Historically, fusuma were painted, often with scenes from nature such as mountains, forests or animals. Today, many feature plain mulberry paper, or have industrially-printed graphics of fans, autumn leaves, cherry blossom, trees, or geometric graphics. Patterns for children featuring popular characters can also be purchased.

Both fusuma and shōji are room dividers that run on wooden rails at the top and bottom. The upper rail is called a kamoi (鴨居; lit. "duck's place"), and the lower is called a shikii (敷居). Traditionally these were waxed, but nowadays they usually have a vinyl lubricating strip to ease movement of the fusuma and shōji. Fusuma are typically made of opaque cloth or paper, while shōji are made of sheer, translucent paper.

Fusuma and shōji, along with tatami straw mats (for the floor), make up a typical Japanese room.

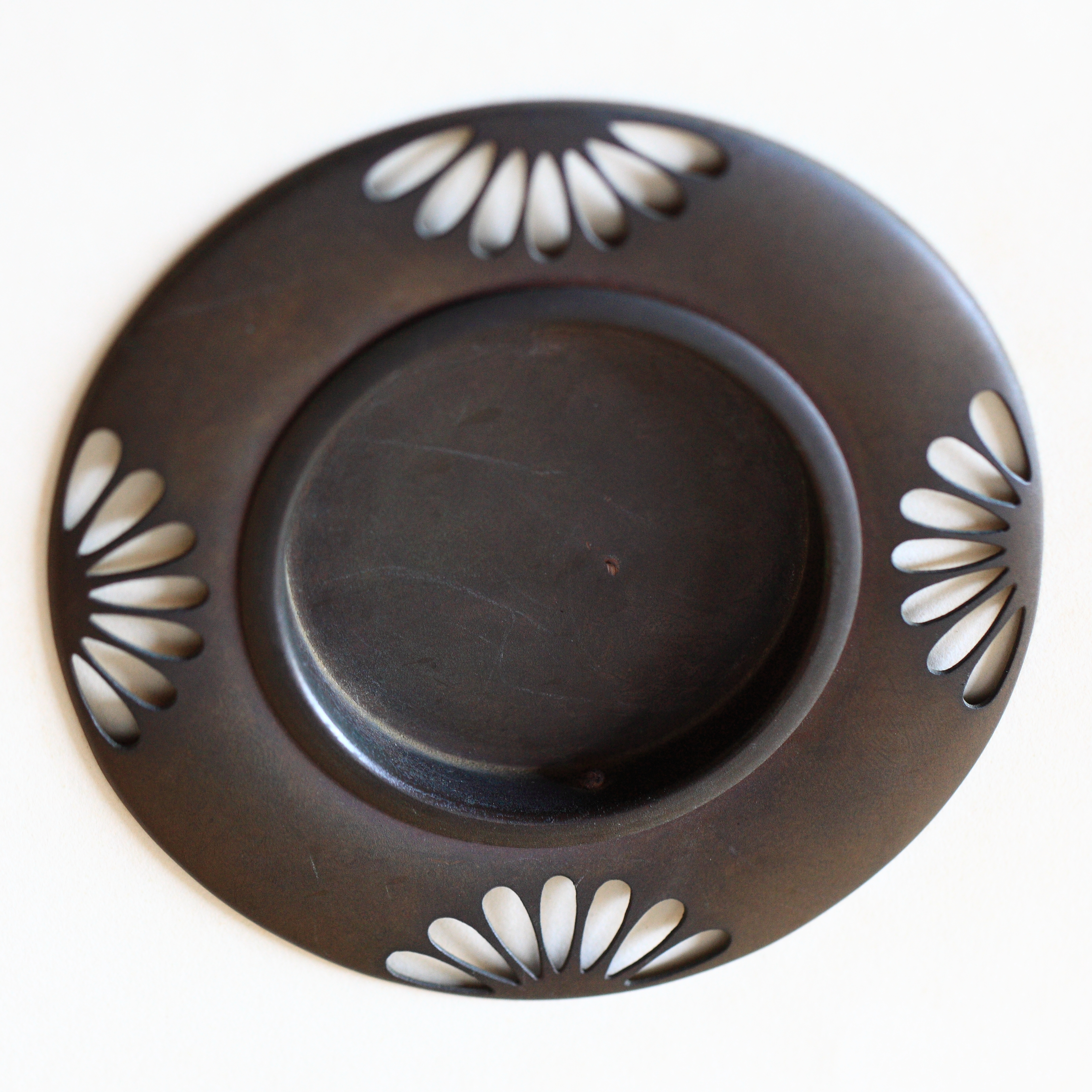
A round finger catch from Kairaku-en

== See also ==
- List of partitions of traditional Japanese architecture
