= Kichō =

Type of Japanese partition

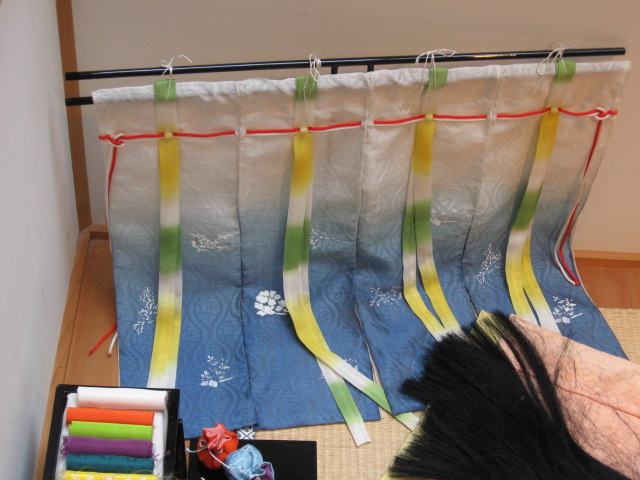
A miniature kichō at the Costume Museum in Kyoto

A kichō (几帳) is a portable multi-paneled silk partition supported by a T-pole. It came into use in aristocratic households during and following the Heian period (794–1185) in Japan when it became a standard piece of furniture. Kichō are similar in appearance to a kabeshiro (壁代, wall-curtain), but are mounted on a free-standing stand rather than a lintel beam. They are less similar to noren, which do not include streamers to tie them up, and are generally used in different social settings.

== Construction ==
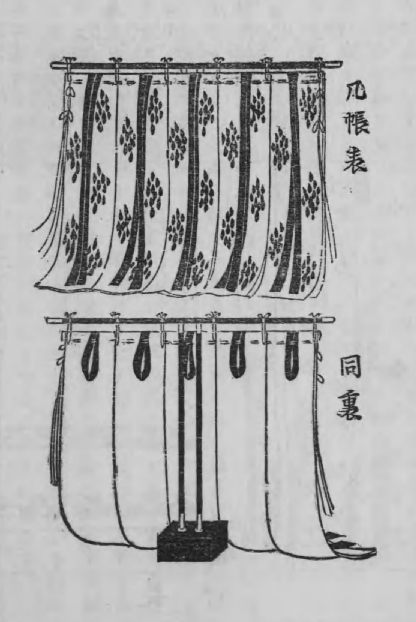
The front (top) and reverse (bottom) of a kichō, showing the katabira, te, ashi, and tsuchii

The curtain or veil (katabira (帷)) hangs via ribbons or other decorative cording from the top crosspiece (te (手, lit. 'hand')) which is supported by the vertical bars (ashi (足, lit. 'leg')) which are supported by the pedestal at the base (tsuchii (土居, lit. 'thing on the ground')). The fabric is generally in two layers: a plain silk back lining, and a fabric with a design on it facing outward. Colorful ribbons of fabric are generally hung in the center of each vertical panel on top of the outer fabric. The ribbons are held in place with a (traditionally) red decorative stitching which runs horizontally a little below the top of the katabira.

The size of the kichō historically depended on where it was used. The largest type, for use just inside bamboo blinds, was four shaku tall by eight shaku wide (about 47.72 inches (121.2 cm) by 95.44 inches (242.4 cm)), with the katabira five or six shaku tall (59.65 inches (151.5 cm) to 71.58 inches (181.8 cm)) and divided equally into five vertical panels.

A medium size kichō, for use inside a room, was three shaku tall by six shaku wide (about 35.79 inches (90.9 cm) by 71.58 inches (181.8 cm)), with the katabira four or five shaku tall (47.72 inches (121.2 cm) to 59.65 inches (151.5 cm)) and divided equally into four vertical panels.

The smallest type, generally only used for chōdai (帳台, curtained sleeping platforms used by royalty during the Heian period), was two shaku tall by one shaku, five sun wide (about 23.86 inches (60.6 cm) by 17.895 inches (45.45 cm)) and divided equally into three vertical panels. This last type was generally used to veil the pillow where the noble woman slept, with the te being made of rosewood or red sandalwood.

== Use ==
The kichō is often placed just on the inside of bamboo blinds, forming a portable double privacy barrier to the outside of the house. They are also used as portable room dividers inside the house. Today, they are most often used as decorations or to hide boxes or other unsightly messes in a home.

In former times, they would often be used to hide noble women from public eyes when they visited shrines or temples, and to provide additional privacy for the women at home. Smaller versions called sashikichō (差几帳) were carried by the female attendants of a noble woman in order to hide her from public view while she traveled.

In the 1880s (late Edo period), kichō were rare, but possibly still used in the houses of daimyō.

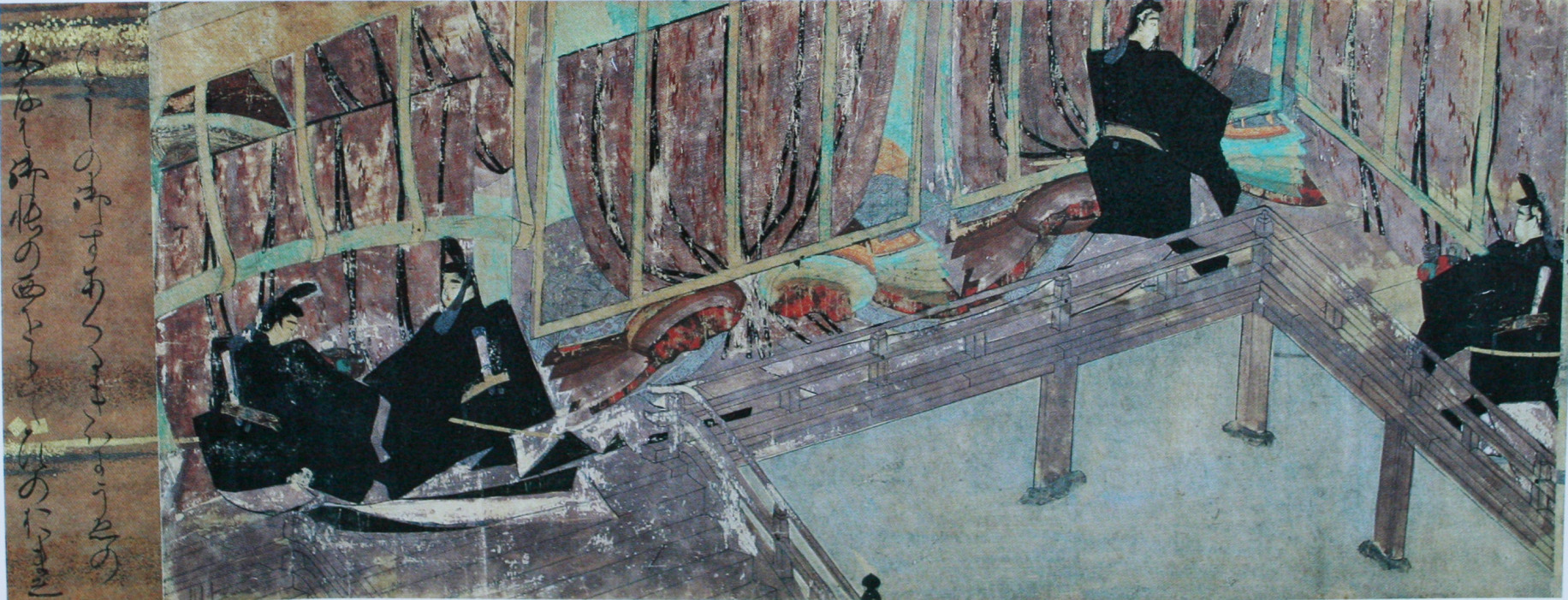
Kichō used behind sudare blinds for gender segregation; the sleeves of the women protrude from behind the screens, while the men sit on the engawa outside. 13th-century illustration from The Diary of Lady Murasaki.

Imperial apartments. Empress Shōshi, her infant son Atsuhira, and an unidentified lady are screened by kichō. Below, her father Fujiwara no Michinaga and her lady-in-waiting, likely Murasaki Shikibu.

== See also ==
- Byōbu (folding screen)
- List of partitions of traditional Japanese architecture
- Pipe and drape
- Purdah
- Sudare (reed blind)
