= Noren =

Traditional Japanese fabric dividers

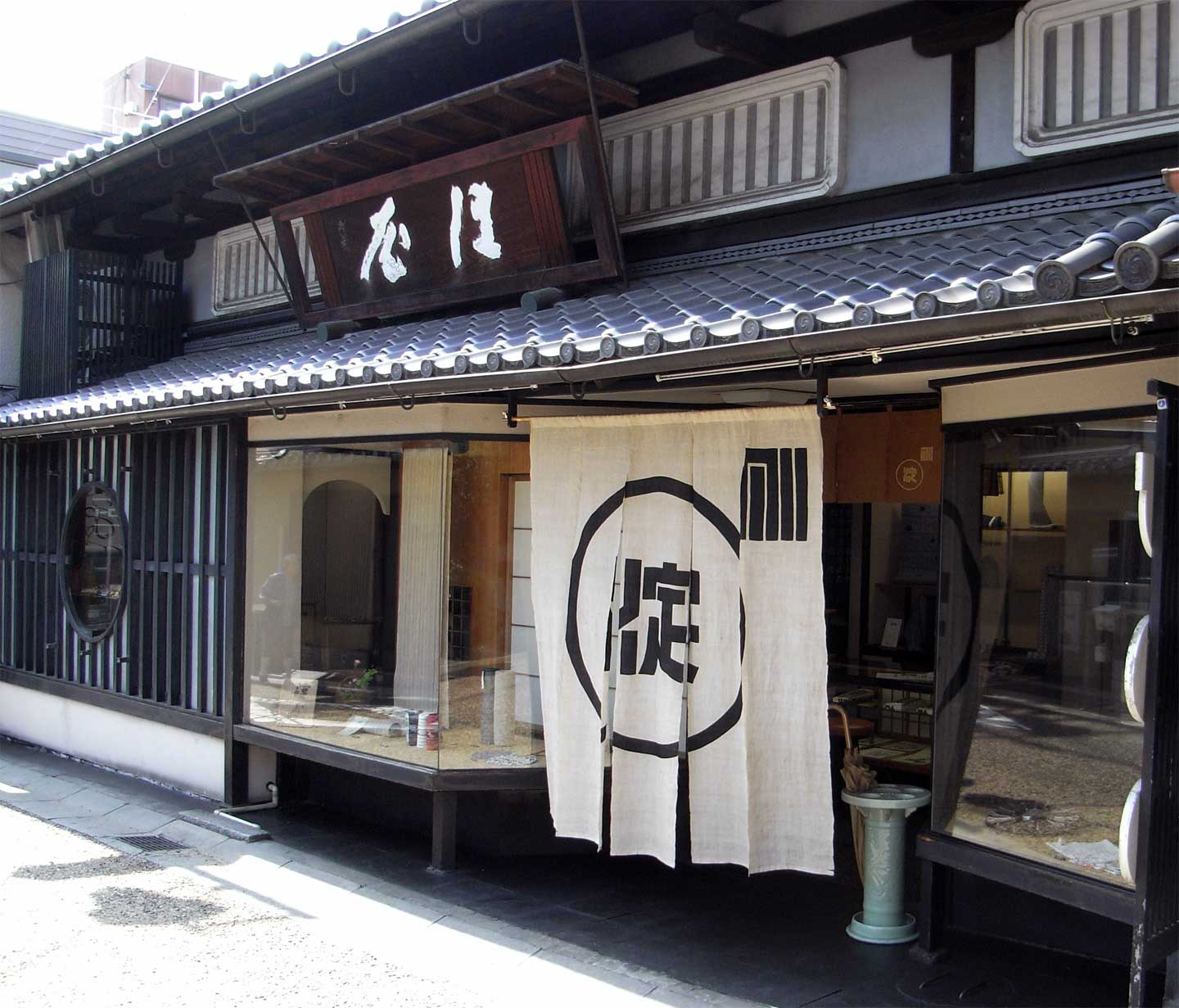
Traditional fabric shop in Nara with noren in front of the entrance

Noren (暖簾) are traditional Japanese fabric dividers hung between rooms, on walls, in doorways, or in windows. They usually have one or more vertical slits cut from the bottom to nearly the top of the fabric, allowing for easier passage or viewing. Noren are rectangular and come in many different materials, sizes, colours, and patterns.

== History ==
The noren originated in China, where it was known as the nuǎnlián (simplified Chinese: 暖帘; traditional Chinese: 暖簾; lit. 'warm curtain'). Japanese people originally used miscanthus, reeds, rice straw, or bamboo as barriers to the entrances of houses. Using fabric curtains as dividers was an idea imported from China around the same time as Zen Buddhism. Noren were introduced to Japan during the late Heian period, and the term noren first appeared in the late Kamakura period. Zen Buddhism had arrived in Japan as early as the Asuka period, but was not firmly established until the Kamakura. Merchants in the Edo period added store names or family crests to the noren to represent the business name or trademark, making the noren a symbol of credibility and reputation.

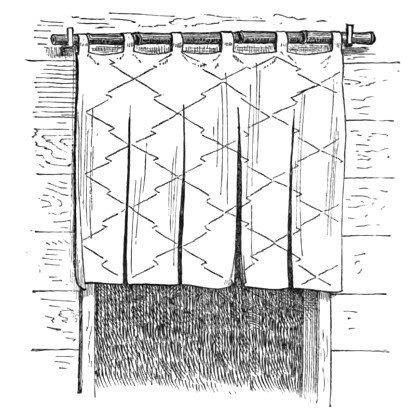
Noren displaying characteristic cuts at intervals, leaving a series of long flaps. This curtain is not readily swayed by the wind, and can easily be passed through as one enters the room.

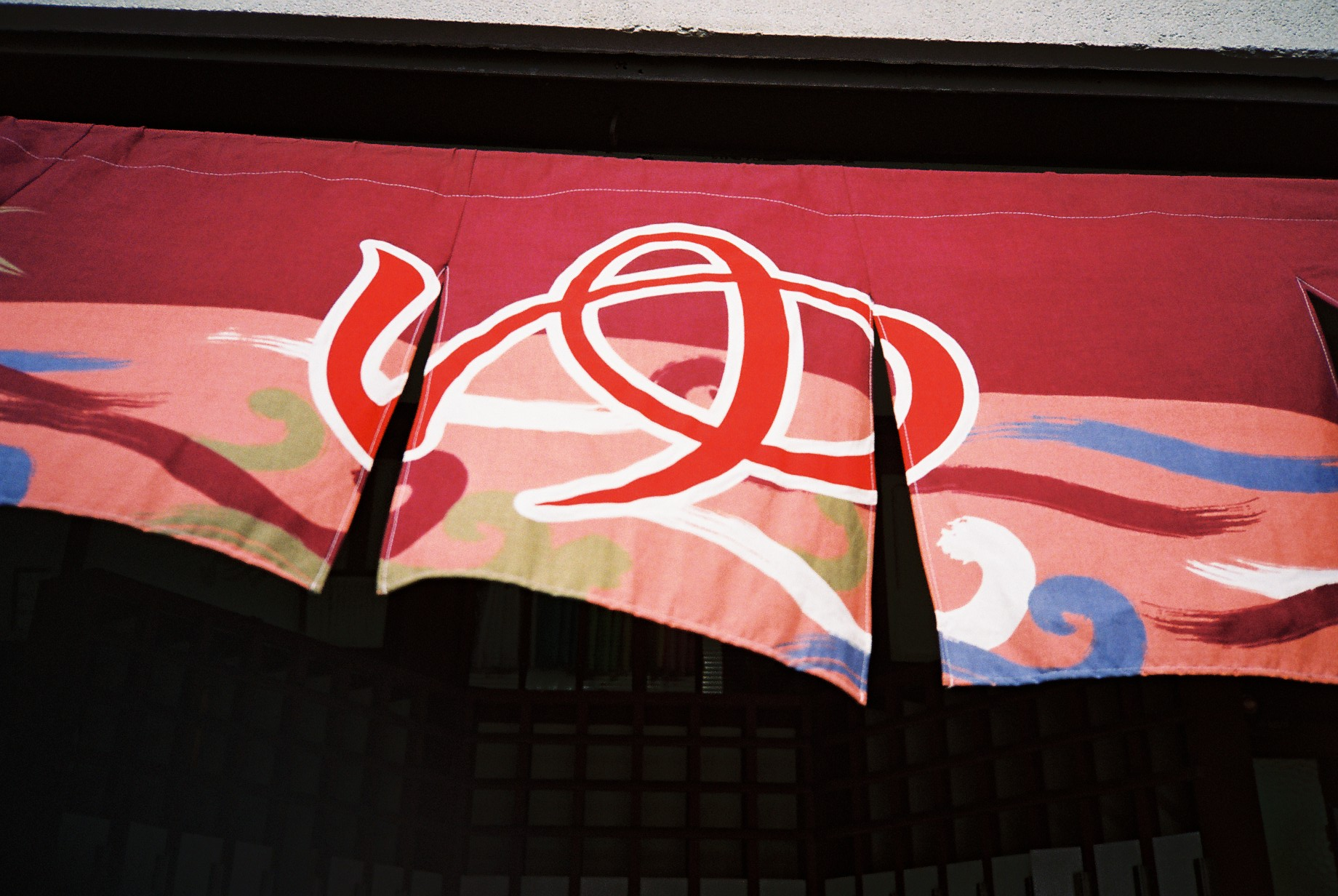
Noren with the ゆ character at the entrance to a sentō

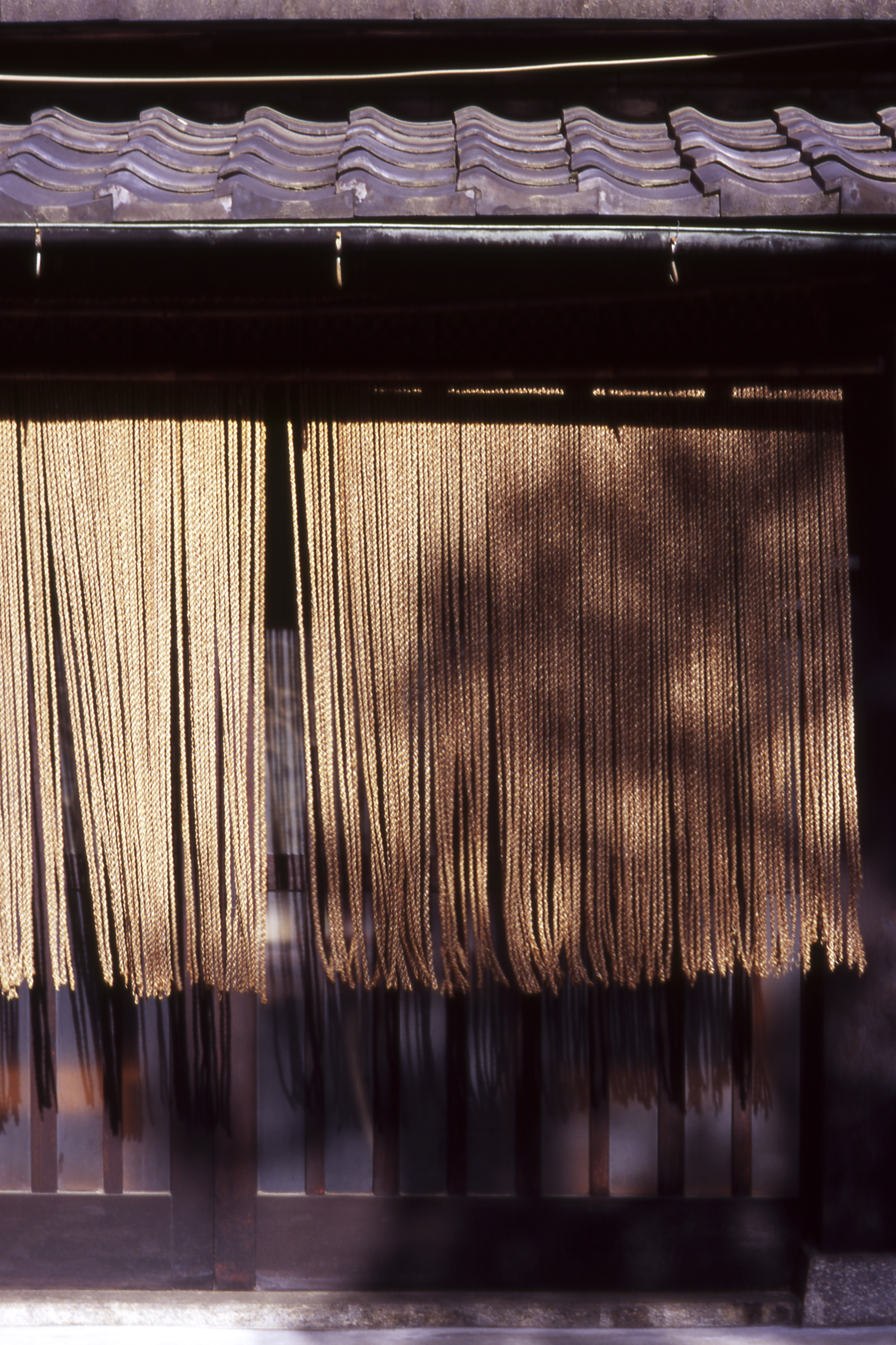
Nawa-noren (cord noren)

== Homes ==
Noren were originally used to protect a house from wind, dust, and rain, as well as to keep a house warm on cold days and to provide shade on hot summer days. They can also be used for decorative purposes or for dividing a room into two separate spaces.

== Businesses ==
Entrance of a yakiniku restaurant with noren curtain at night, Honmachi, Tsuruga

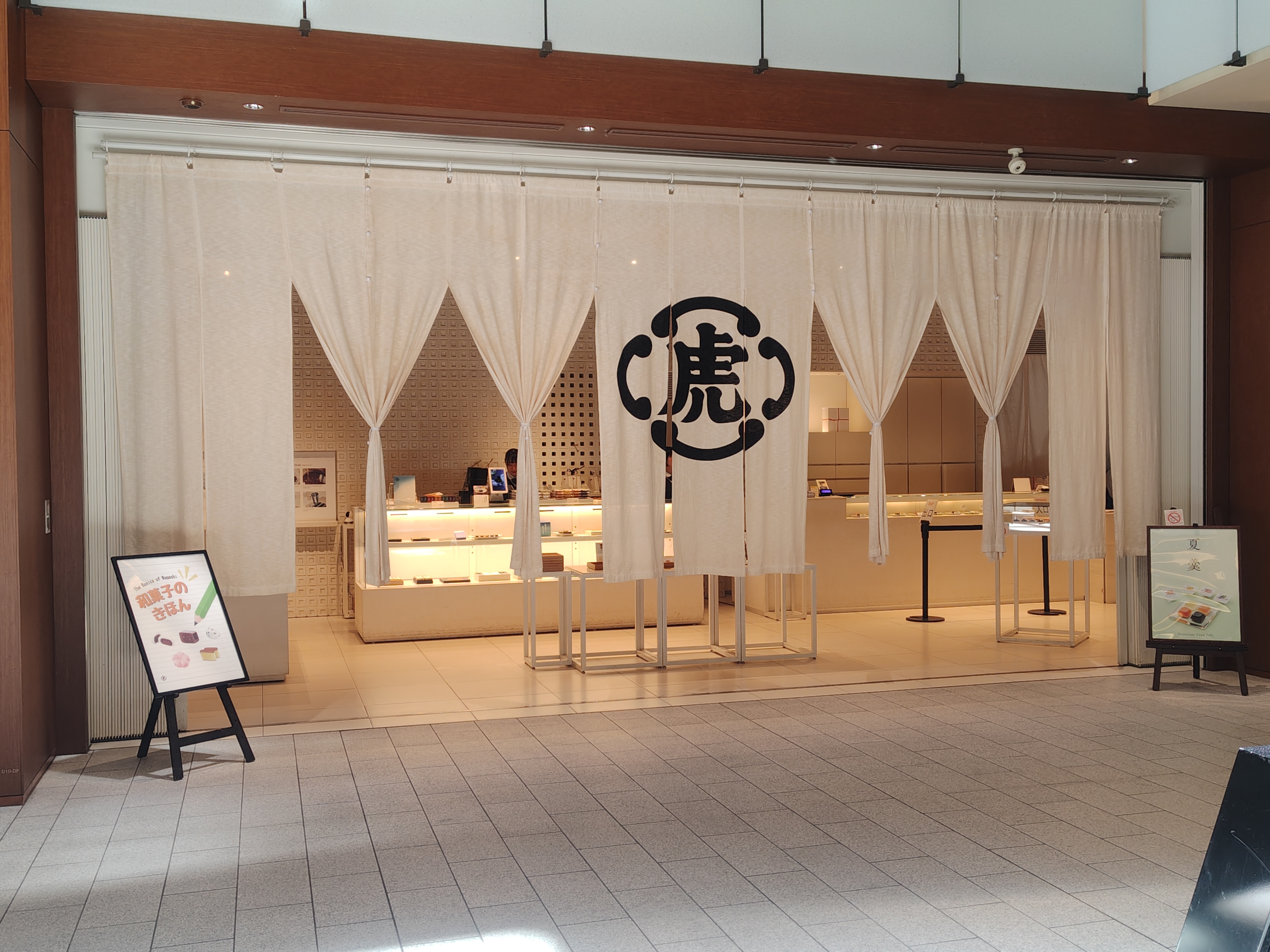
Toraya Mon on Noren at the Roppongi store in Tokyo

Exterior noren are traditionally used by shops and restaurants as a means of protection from sun, wind, and dust, and for displaying a shop's name or logo. Names are often Japanese characters, especially kanji, but may be mon emblems, Japanese rebus monograms, or abstract designs. Noren designs are generally traditional to complement their association with traditional establishments, but modern designs also exist. Interior noren are often used to separate dining areas from kitchens or other preparation areas, which also prevents smoke or smells from escaping.

Because a noren often features the shop name or logo, the word in Japanese may also refer to a company's brand value. Most notably, in Japanese accounting, the word noren is used to describe the goodwill of a company after an acquisition.

Sentō (commercial bathhouses) also place noren across their entrances with the kanji yu (湯, lit. 'hot water') or the corresponding hiragana ゆ, typically blue in color for men and red for women. They are also hung in the front entrance to a shop to signify that the establishment is open for business, and they are always taken down at the end of the business day.

== See also ==
- Curtain
- Kichō
- Portière (insulating door curtain)
- Sudare
