= Jinmaku =

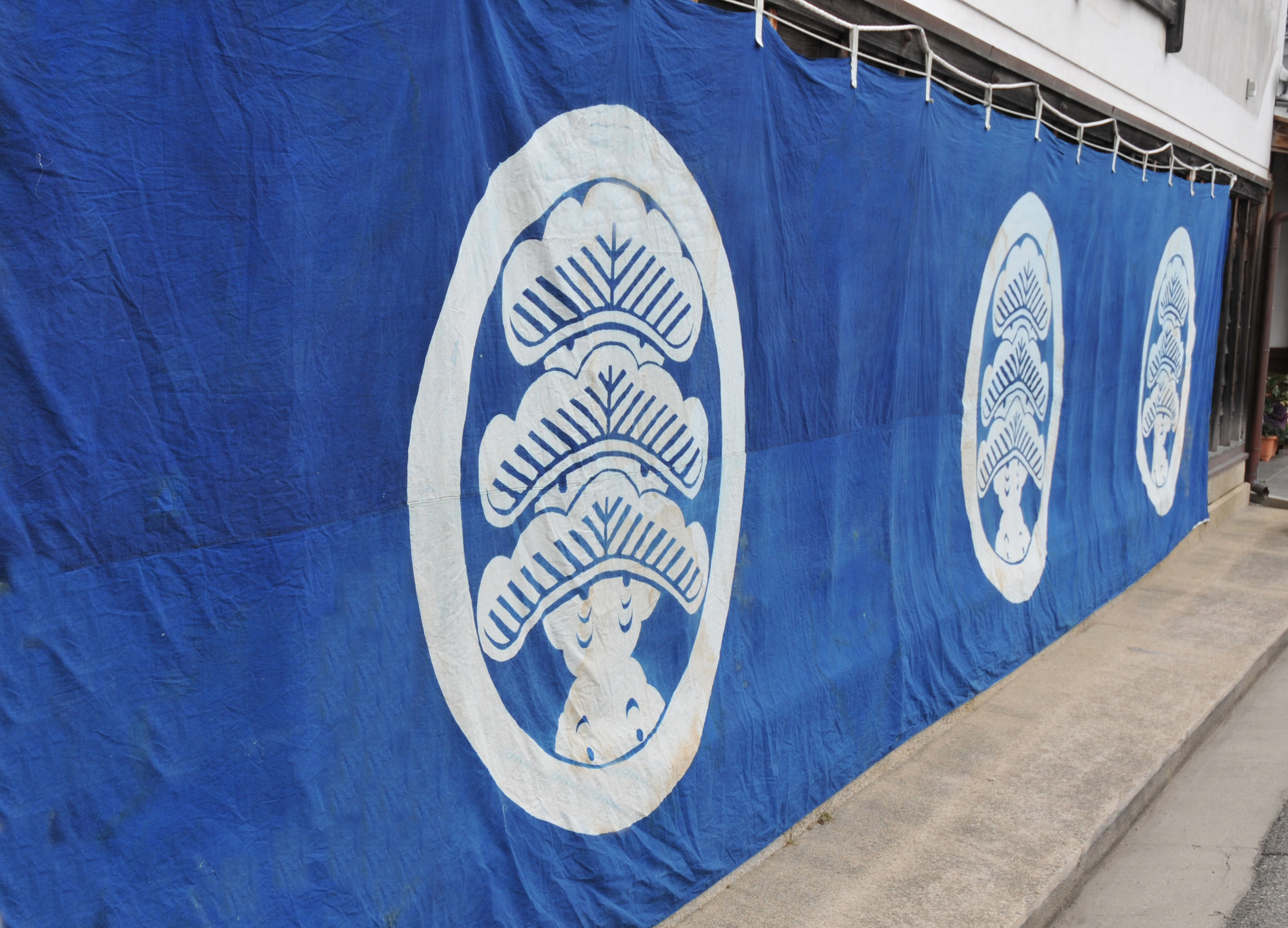
A jinmaku with mon (Sanshu Izutsu Yashiki in Kagawa Prefecture)

Jinmaku (陣幕) is a curtain used in setting up a military encampment commonly seen from the pre-modern era in Japan. The jinmaku were also historically known as a gunmaku (軍幕), or "military curtain".

== Origin ==
Jinmaku literally means "camp curtain". In the Japanese the word is formed from two kanji. The first, 陣, means "military camp" and the second, 幕 means "curtain".

== Early use ==
In ancient Japan jinmaku were tied to poles and stretched around field encampments to form a defensive barrier. References to its use as early in the Nara period (710–794) are found in the Konjaku Monogatarishū, a Japanese collection of over one thousand tales written during the late Heian period (794–1185). Soldiers in the Konjaku Monogatarishū slept in an area surrounded by jinmaku to provide protection while sleeping. Jinmaku were typically constructed of hemp cloth. Illustrations on the Mongol invasion in the Zenkunen kassen emaki depict the appearance of clan mon emblems on jinmaku in the 13th century. The style and construction of jinmaku were standardized in the Muromachi period (1336–1573).

== Edo period ==
The Honchō Gunki Kō (Thoughts on Japanese Military Equipment), a military manual written in 1709 by Arai Hakuseki (1657–1725), lays out standard measurements for jinmaku. Arai, an advisor to the shōgun Tokugawa Ienobu, recorded that a jinmaku should be 1.5 m (5 ft) tall and 8.4 m (28 ft) wide. The number of makukuji (幕串), or poles for hanging the jinmaku, was set at 10 for a taisho officer and 8 for other soldiers, tethers only in white, black, or blue, and mon clan emblems placed in between three, five, or seven places. In the Edo period military science became popular among samurai and gave religious meaning to jinmaku as a sacred item.

== Modern use ==
Jinmaku are used in festivals and theaters, especially for open-air performances. Traditionally the jinmaku is thought to have the power to drive evil away from the stage.
