= Sudare =

Traditional Japanese screens or blinds

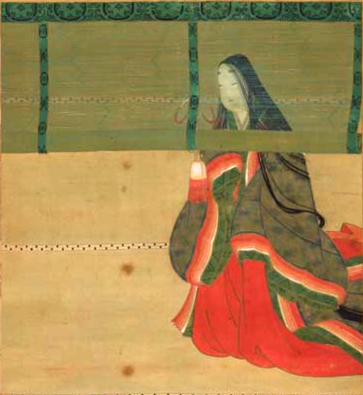
The writer Sei Shōnagon standing behind a misu

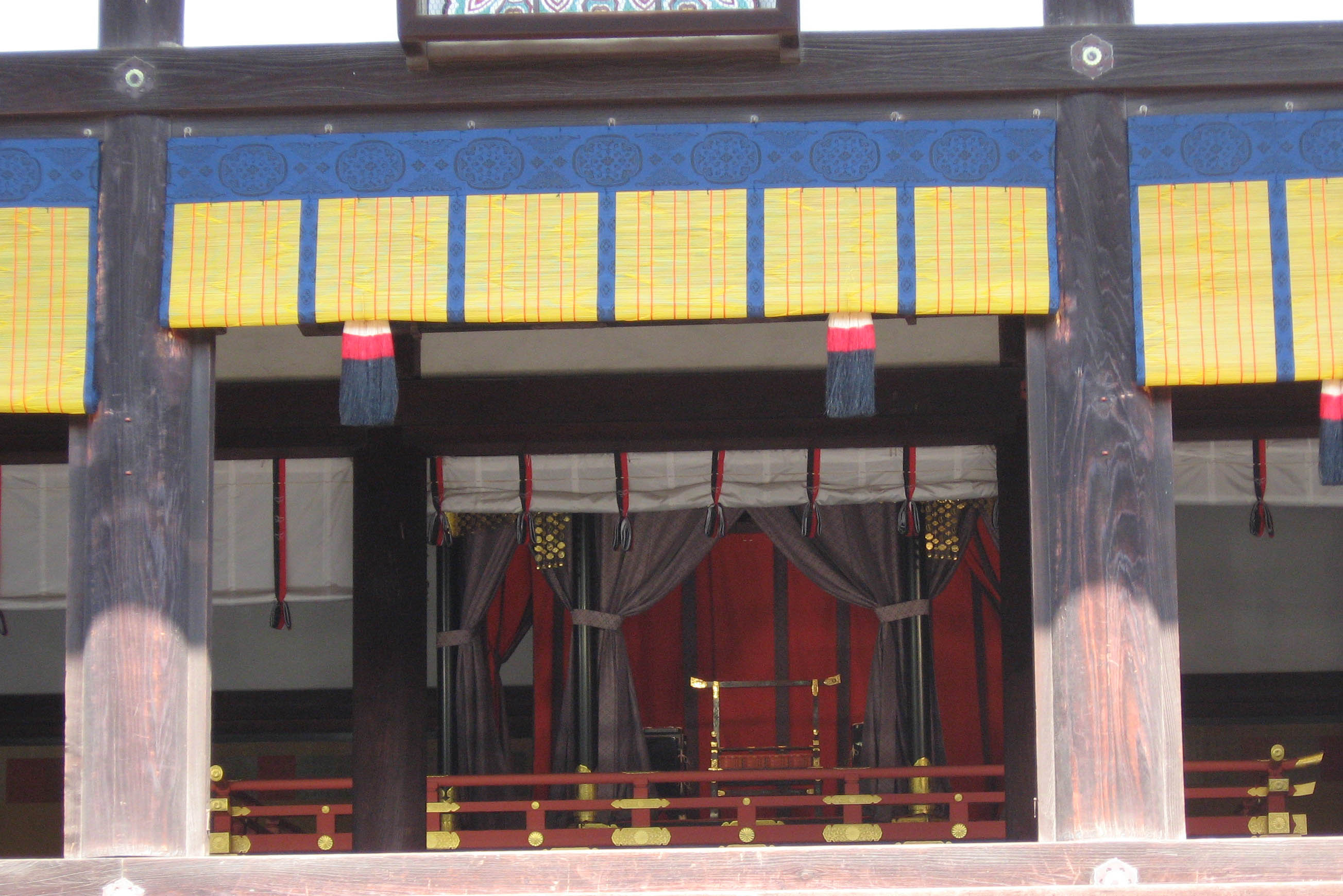
Misu protecting the view to the Imperial throne in the Shishin-den of Kyoto Imperial Palace

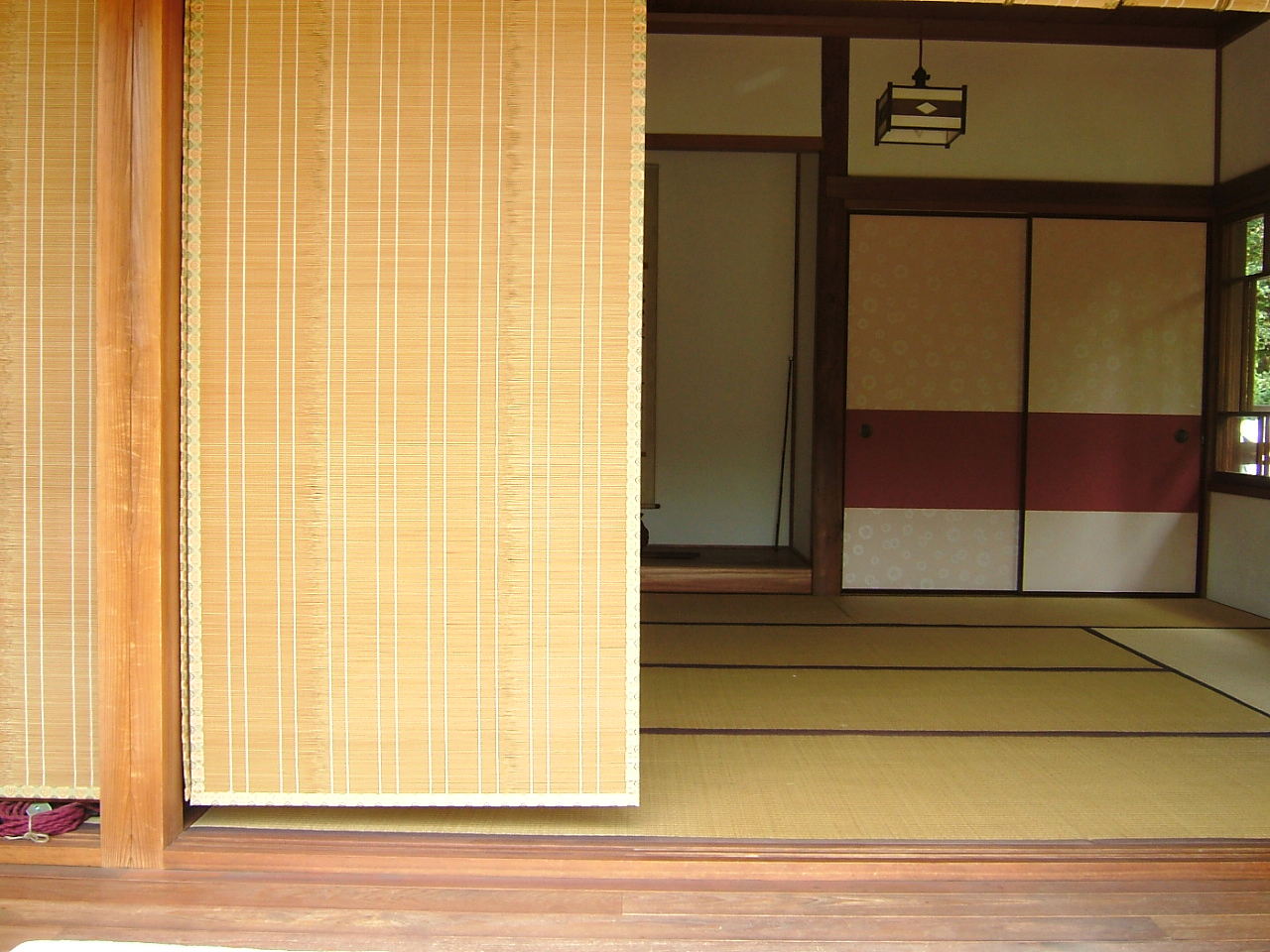
Less formal (but still cloth-bound) sudare in a common home; from the more brightly-lit side, they are opaque

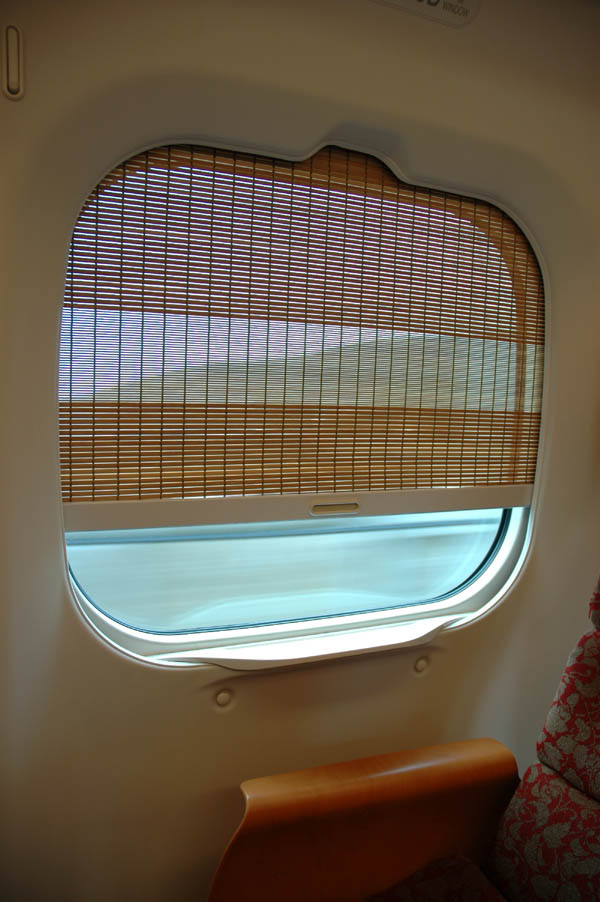
Sudare on a train; from the more dimly-lit side, they are transparent

Sudare (簾/すだれ) are traditional Japanese screens or blinds, made of horizontal slats of decorative wood, bamboo, or other natural material, woven together with simple string, colored yarn, or other decorative material to make nearly solid blinds. Sudare can be either rolled or folded up out of the way. They are also sometimes called misu (御簾/みす), particularly if they have a green fabric hem. Yoshizu, non-hanging sudare, are made of vertical slats of common reed and used as screen.

Sudare are used in many Japanese homes to shield the verandah and other openings of the building from sunlight, rain, and insects. They are normally put up in spring and taken down again in autumn. Their light structure allows breezes to pass through, a benefit in the hot Japanese summers. Since the building materials are easy to find, sudare can be made cheaply.

Elaborate sudare for palaces and villas used high-quality bamboo, with expensive silk and gold embroidery worked in. Sometimes they featured paintings, most often on the inside; some Chinese screens had symbols painted on the outside as well.

== Social role ==
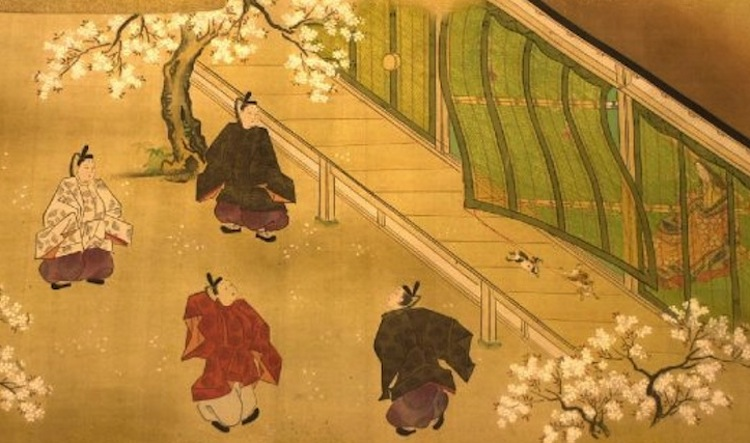
Outside view of the Imperial Palace from The Tale of Genji. From this viewpoint, it would not be possible to see through the sudare; artistic license is used.

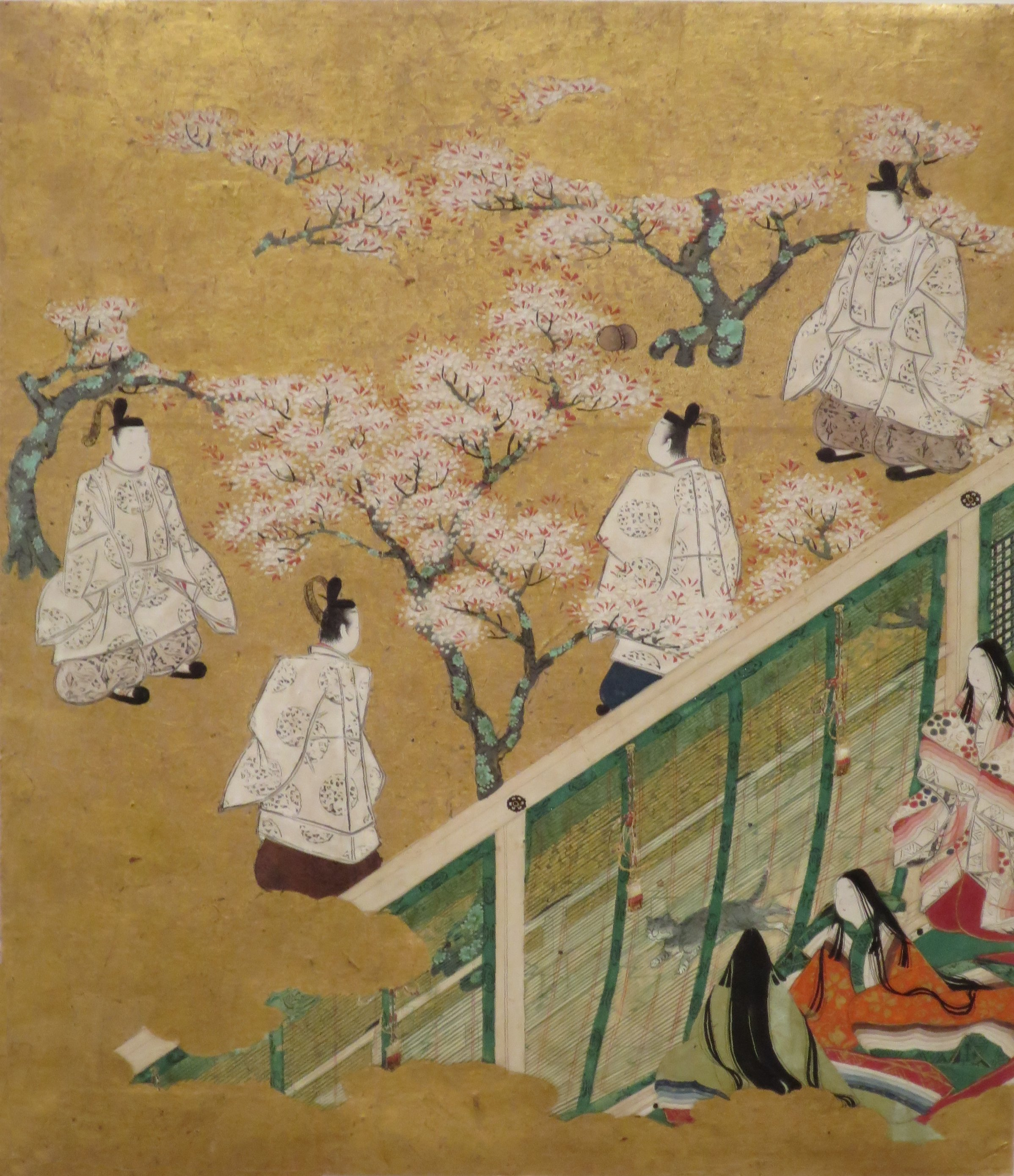
Inside view of the same scene from The Tale of Genji

Sudare protect the inhabitants of the building not only from the elements, but also from the eyes of outsiders. They are featured prominently in The Tale of Genji.

During the Heian period (794–1185), a court lady would conceal herself behind a screen when speaking with a man outside her immediate family. She could peep through it and see her interlocutor, but because he had to remain at a distance from it, he could not see her. Only with her permission might he step closer and only she would ever raise the screen. Any unwarranted moves on the man's part were seen as a grave breach of etiquette and a threat against the lady's honour.

Sudare were also used in imperial audiences. Since looking directly at the Emperor of Japan (tennō; lit. 'heavenly ruler') was forbidden, he would sit hidden behind a screen in the throne hall, with only his shoes showing. This practice fell out of use as imperial power declined.

== Modern production ==
Following the Edo period (1603–1867) and in the ensuing Meiji period (1868–1911), the production of sudare went into decline and became a traditional handicraft, but they still are sold and shipped abroad by various companies. These sudare are typically woven on looms.

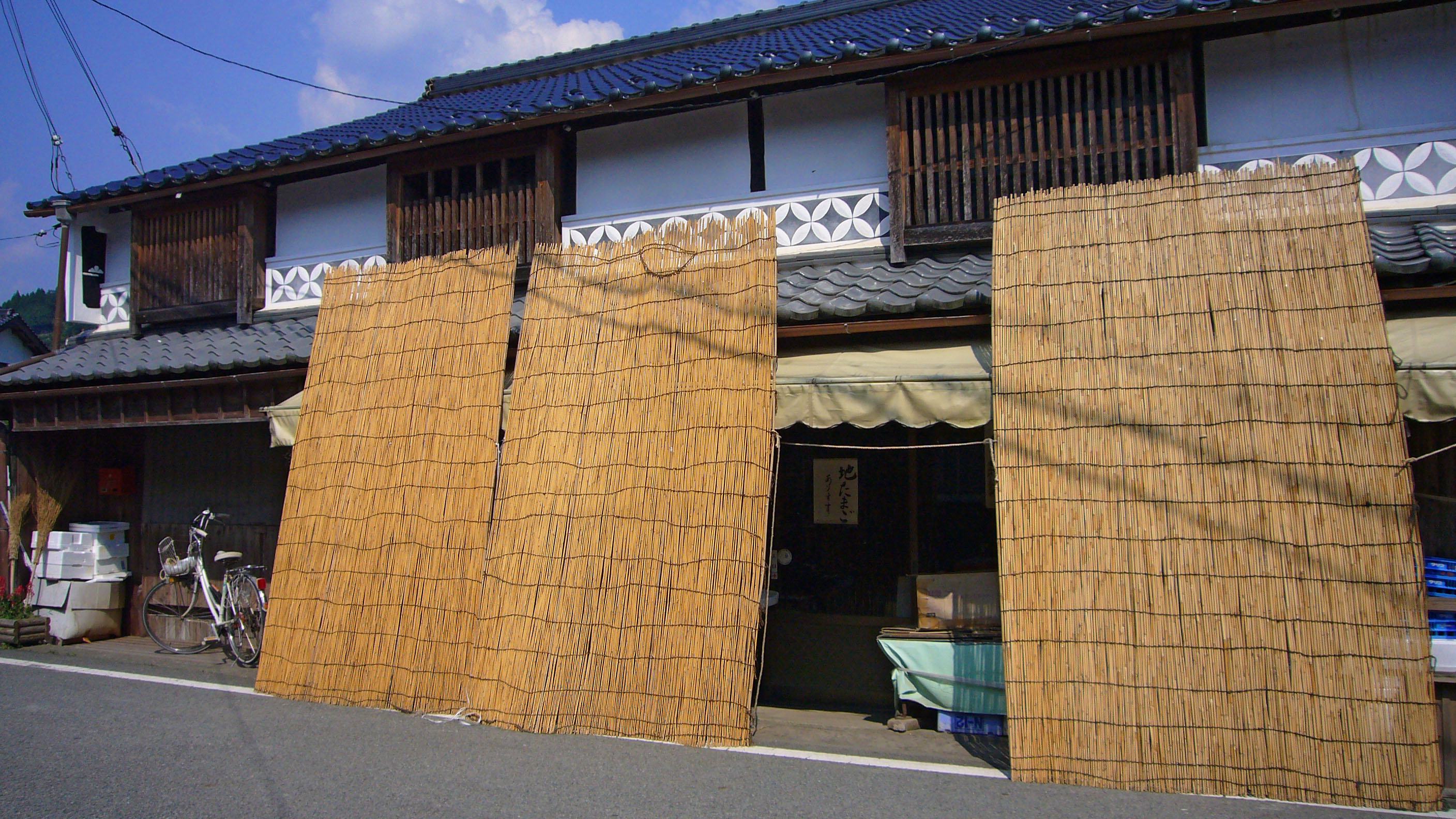
Examples of yoshi sudare or yoshizu screens outside a shop in Hyōgo Prefecture

== Museum ==
A museum in Amano-cho, Kawachinagano, Osaka traces the history of sudare. Tools and machines used to manufacture them, as well as sudare from other countries, are on display.

== Gallery ==
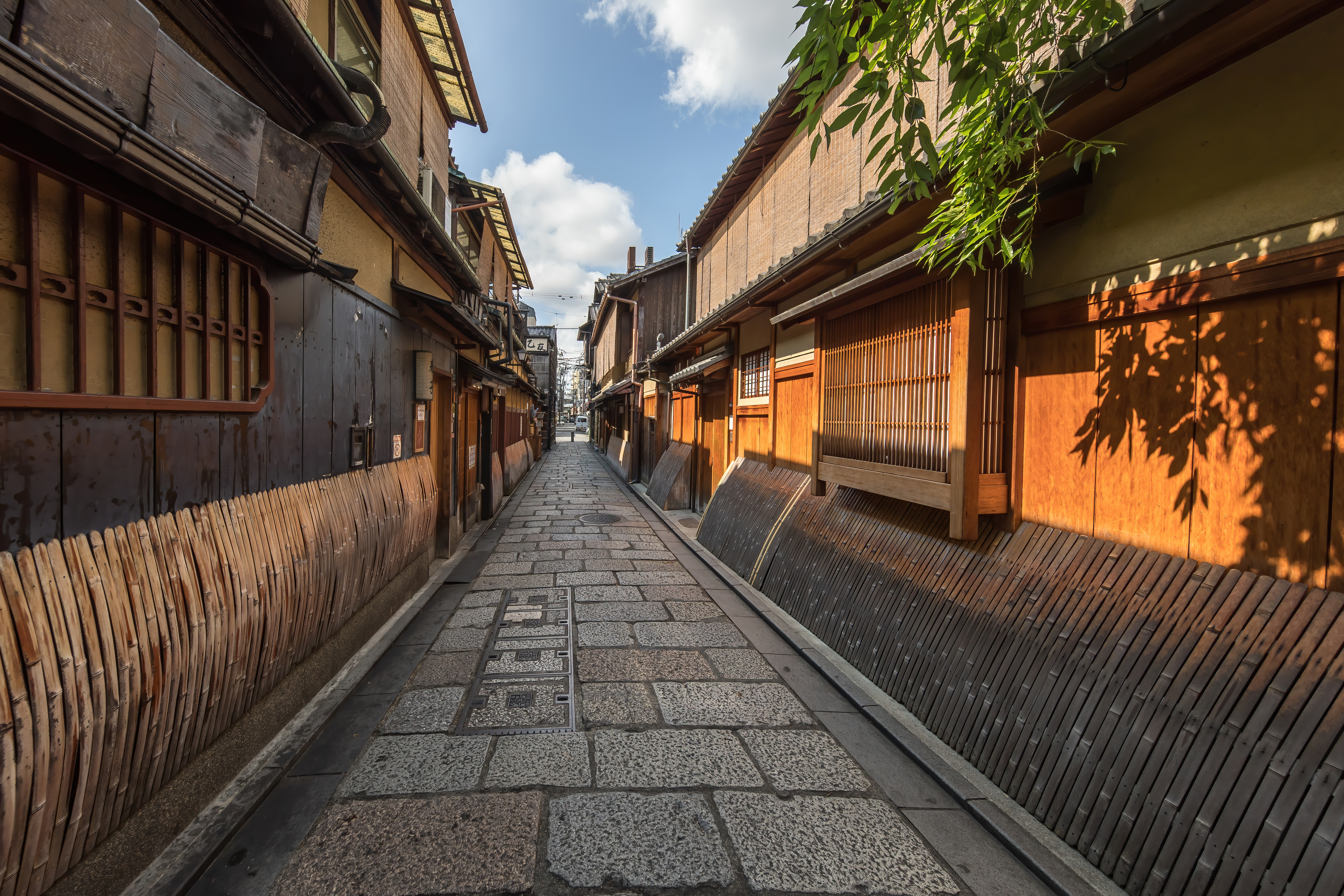
Sudare in the street leading to Tatsumi Bridge in Gion, Kyoto

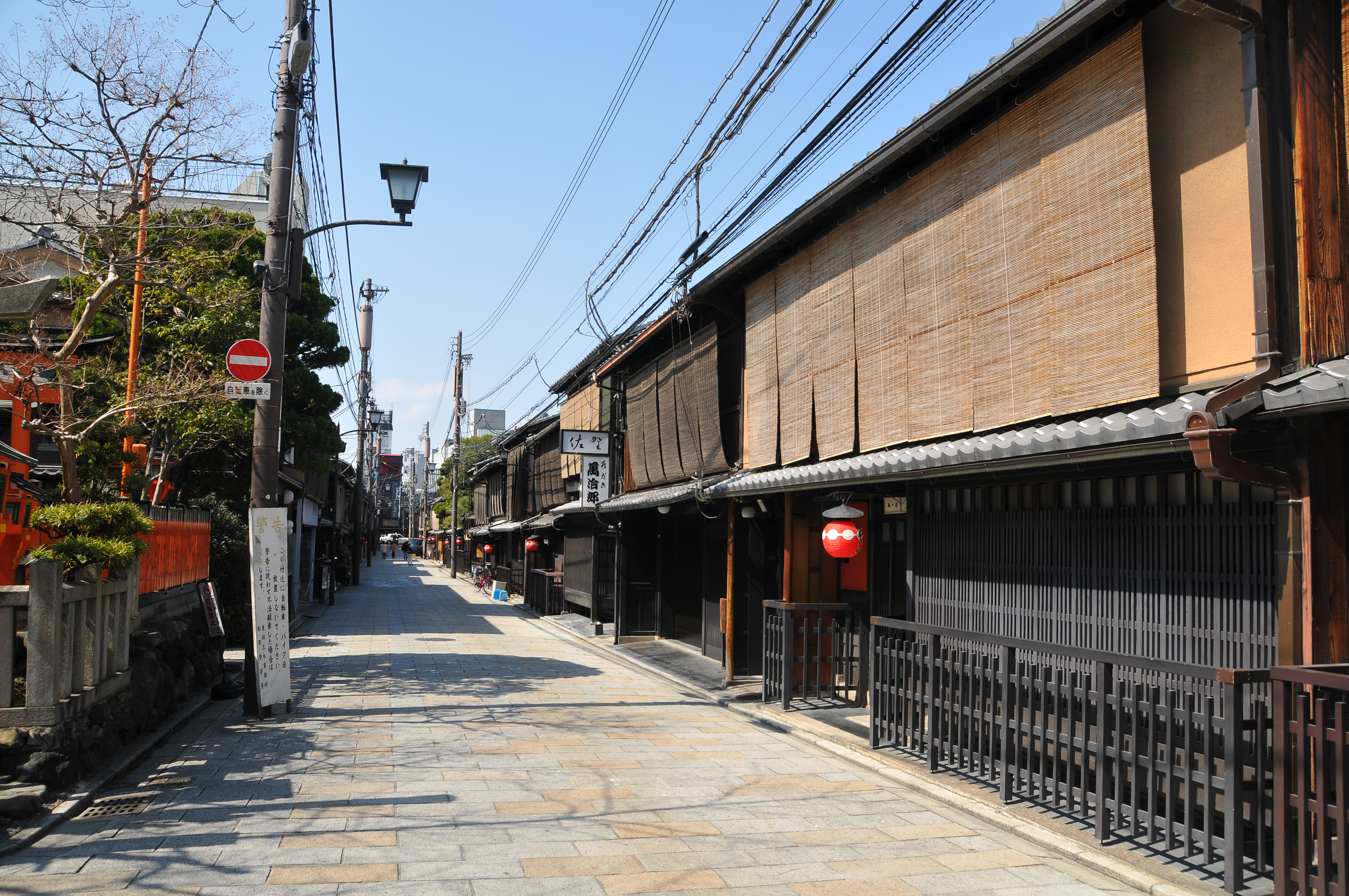
Sudare of various ages on a street in Kyoto. These are not cloth-bound at the edges.

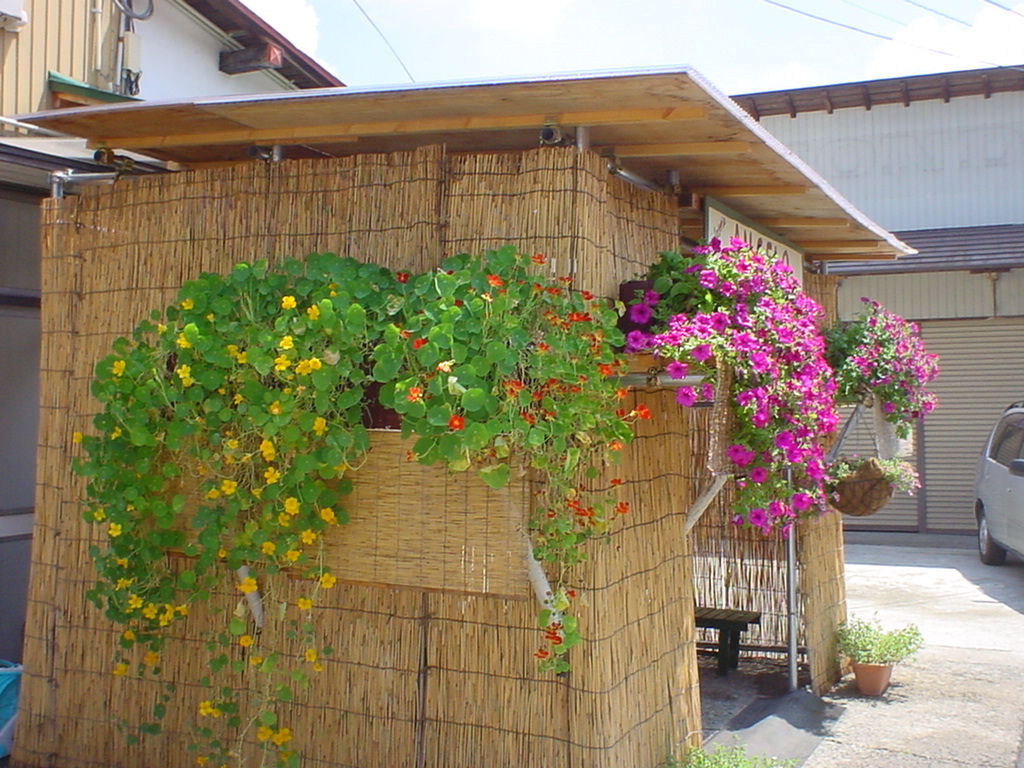
Summerhouse made of yoshi sudare; stems are vertical.

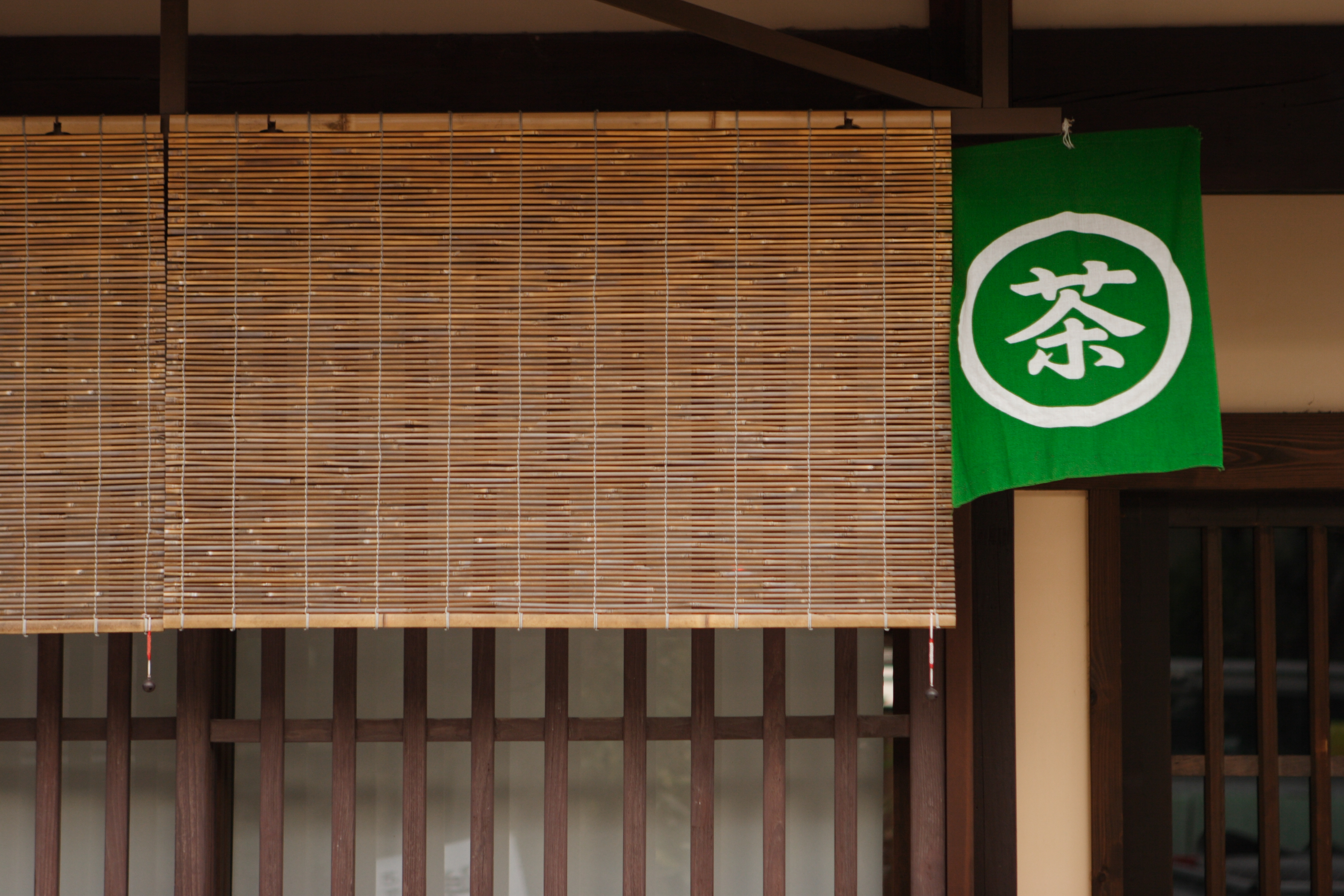
Sudare shading the koshi (wooden lattice) of a teahouse; the sign says "Tea".

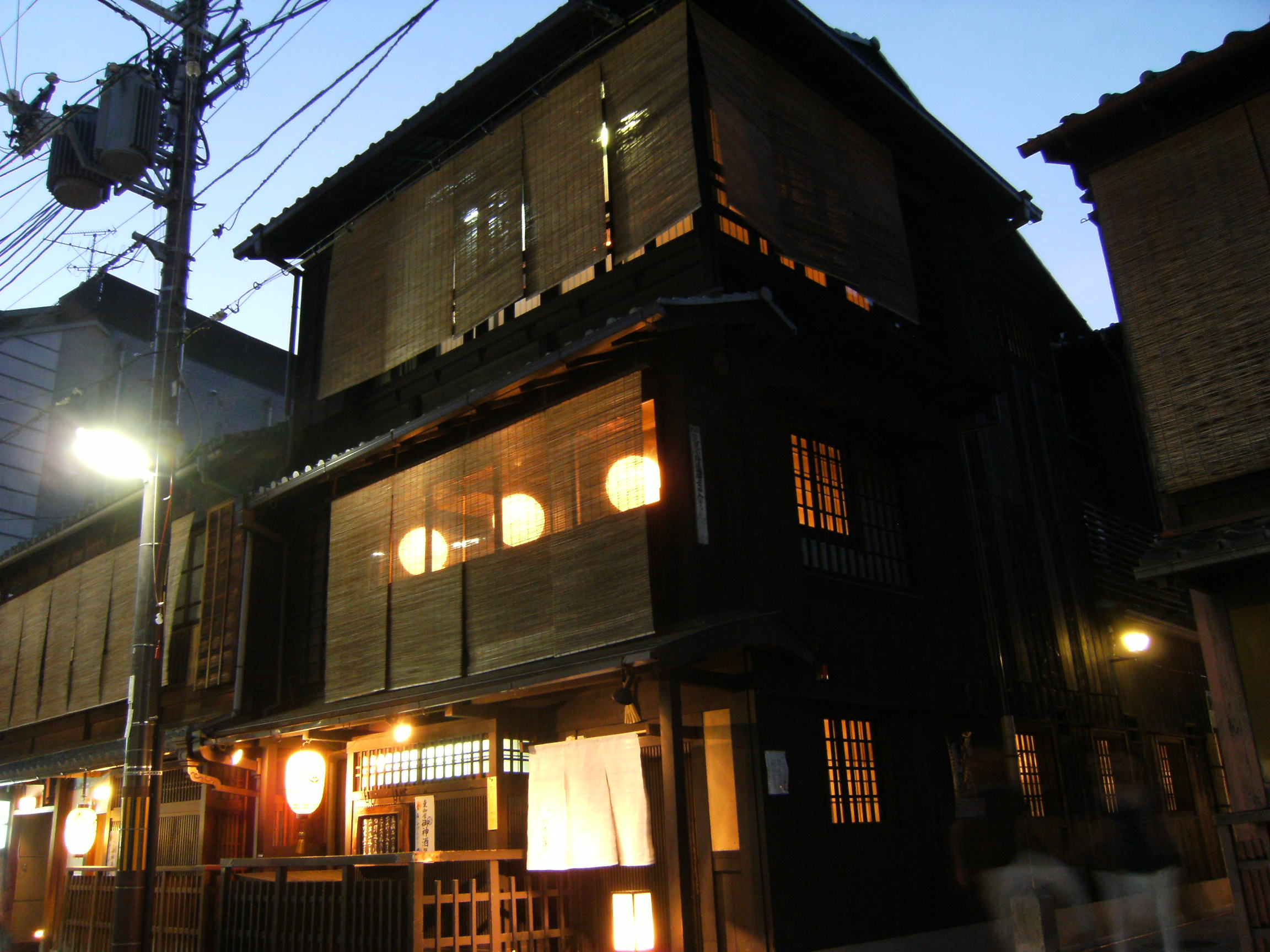
Sudare on a three-story machiya at dusk. Opaque amado shutters may soon be put up for privacy.

== See also ==
- Kichō
- Makisu
- Nankin Tamasudare
- Noren
- Shōji
