= Hassō-an =

Coordinates: 43°02′49″N 141°21′11″E

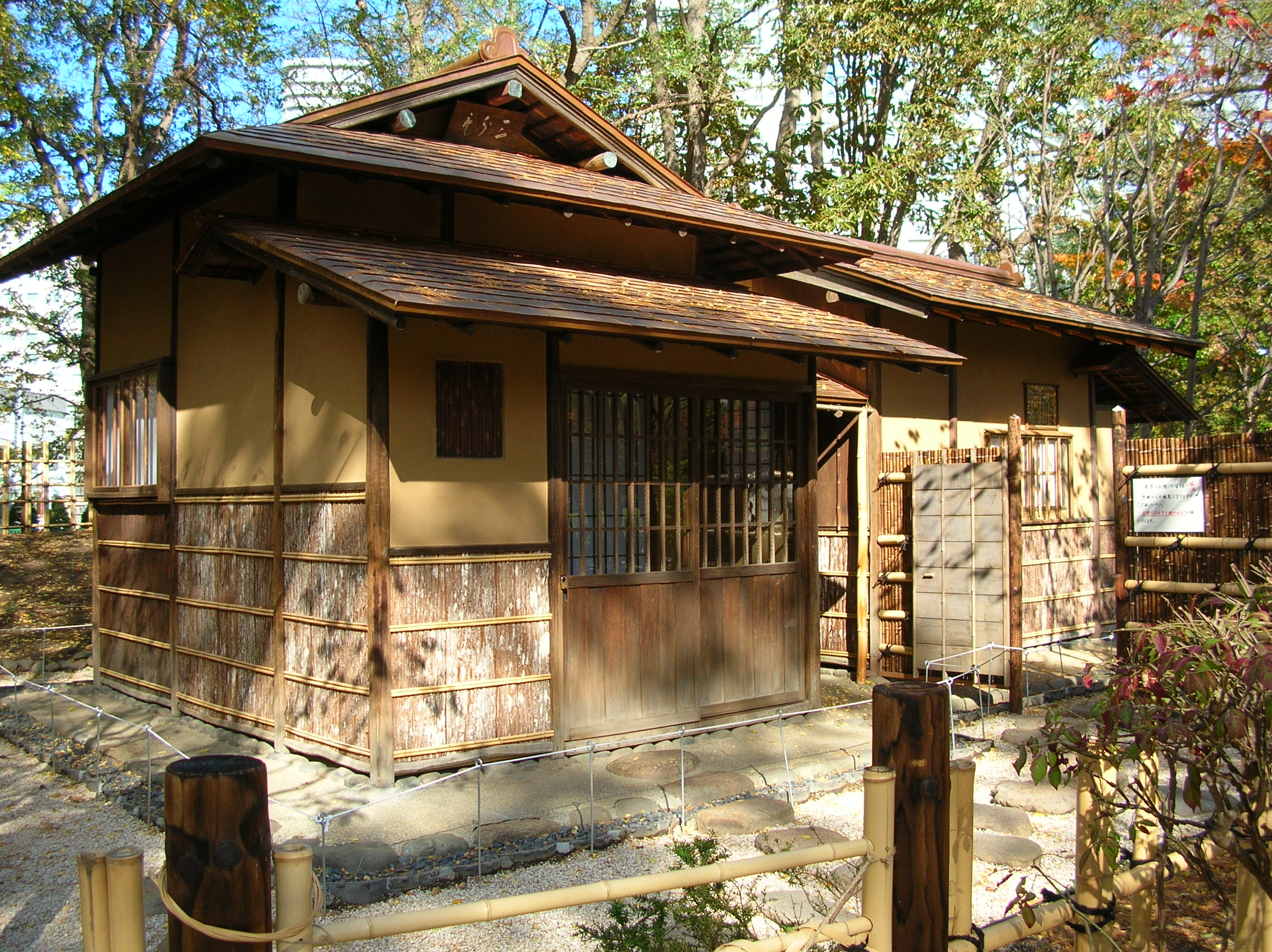
Hassō-an

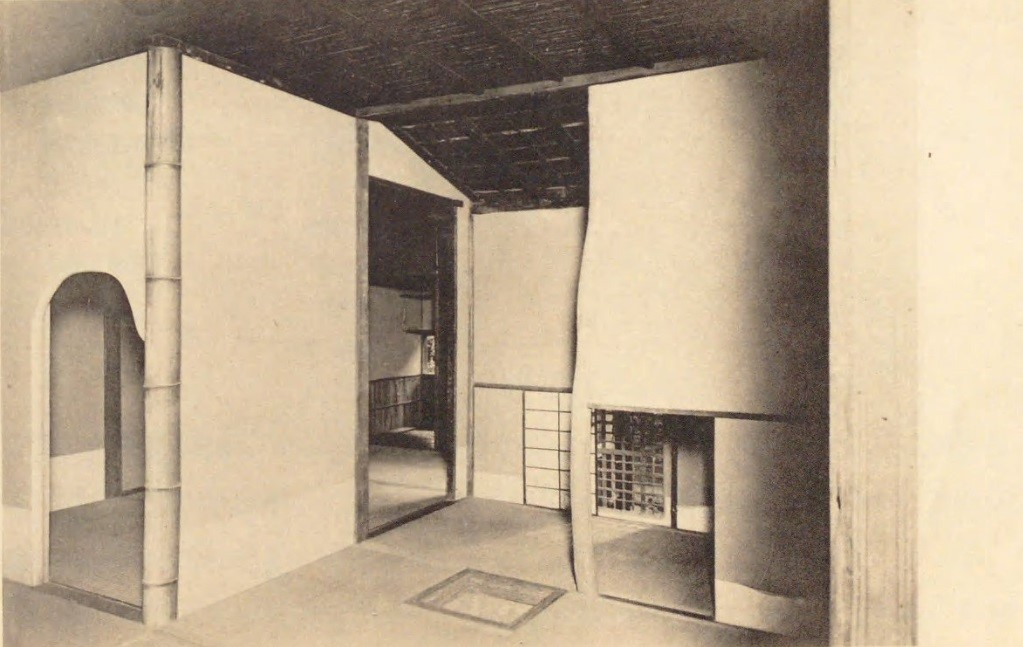
Historic interior view

Hassō-an (八窓庵) is a historic chashitsu located today in Sapporo, Hokkaido, northern Japan. The name means “eight-window tea house”.

The structure dates to the Edo period. It was originally located at Komuro Castle (小室城) in Ōmi Province, present Nagahama, Shiga. It was designed by the tea master Kobori Enshū (1579-1647). It was relocated to Sapporo in 1919. In 1989, a surrounding garden was created by Kobori Sokei, a tea master and a 12th generation descendant of Kobori Enshū.

It is on the list of Cultural Properties of Japan — structures (Hokkaidō).

== See also ==
- Sarumen Chaseki (猿面茶席) at Nagoya Castle
- Rokusō-an at Nara
