= Rokusō-an =

Tea room in Nara, Japan

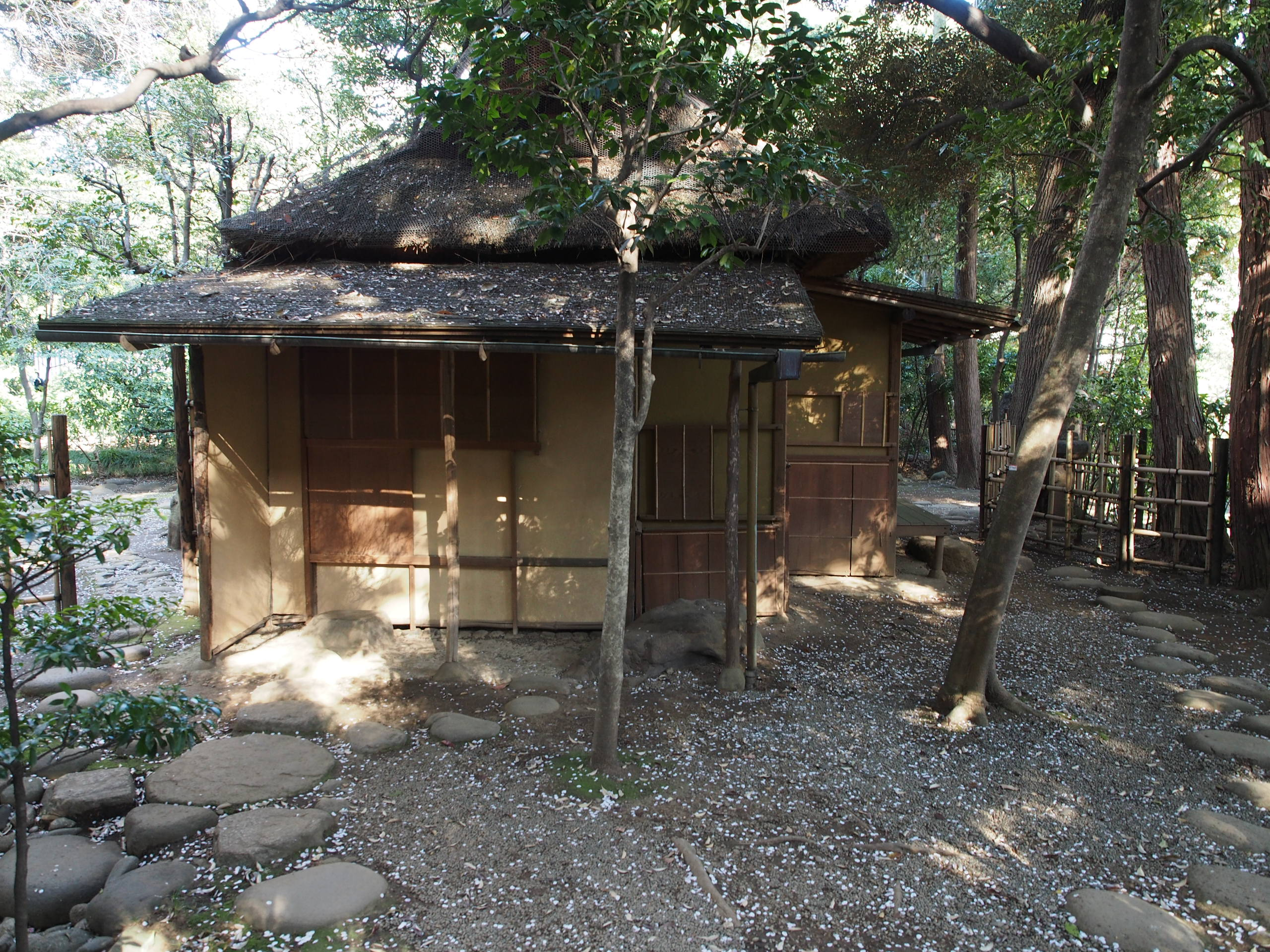
Rokusō-an

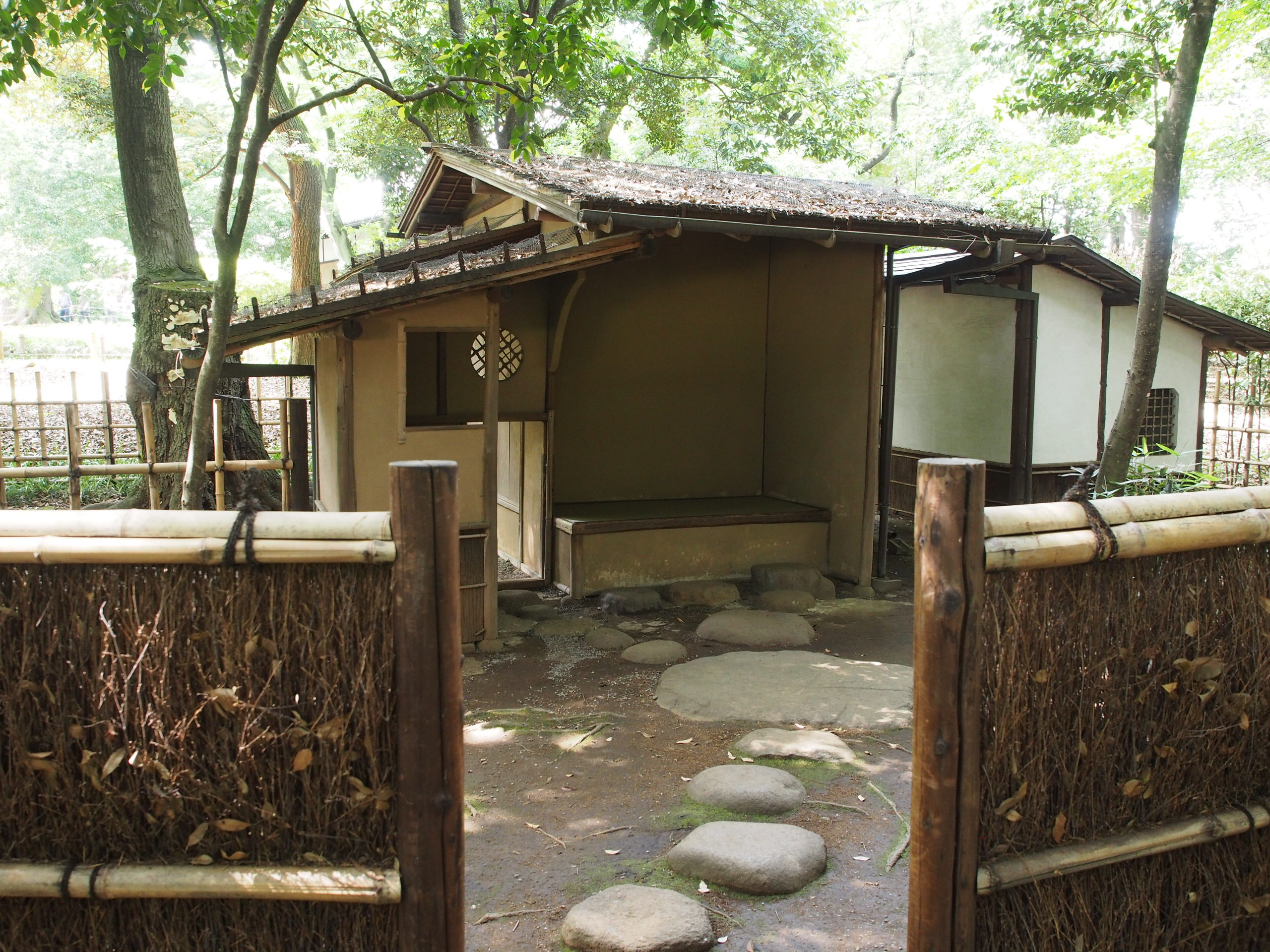
Waiting area

Rokusō-an (六窓庵 "Six Window Hut") is a chashitsu.

It was formerly located at Kōfuku-ji in Nara and considered one of the San-meiseki (三名席, Three Famous Tearooms). It was initially constructed during the Edo period and later relocated due to its deteriorated state and is now in the gardens of the Tokyo National Museum.

== See also ==
- Sarumen Chaseki at Nagoya Castle
- Hassō-an
