= Glass Tea House - KOU-AN =

Japanese teahouse created by Tokujin Yoshioka

Glass Tea House – Kou-an
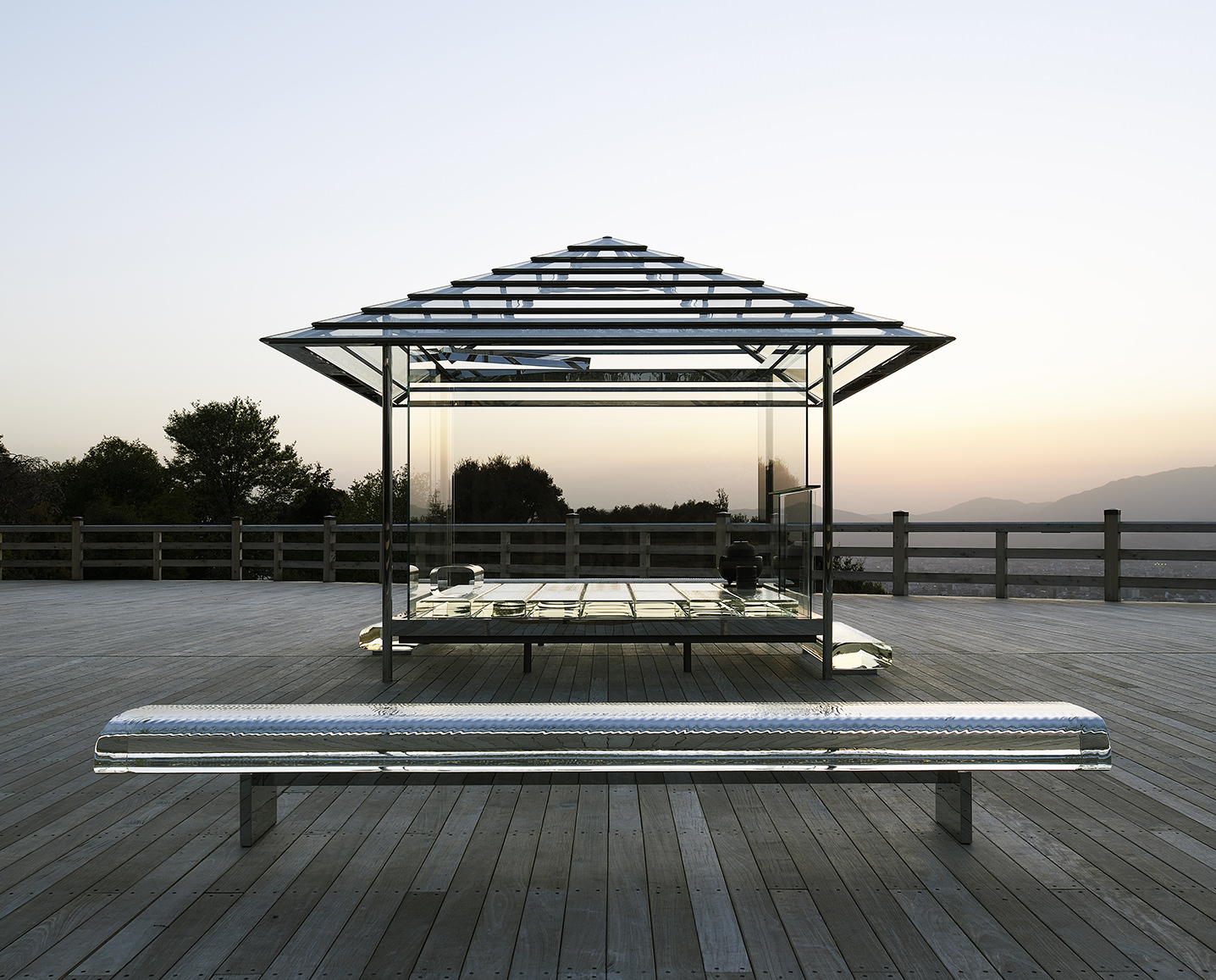
- Artist: Tokujin Yoshioka
- Year: 2011
- Medium: Glass and stainless steel

Glass Tea House – Kou-an is a chashitsu (teahouse) created by Japanese designer and artist Tokujin Yoshioka.

The teahouse made its debut at the 54th Venice Biennale in 2011. Starting with the exhibition at Tendai Sect Shōren-in, Kyoto, in 2015, the teahouse is traveling inside Japan, and it is currently exhibited at the National Art Center, Tokyo.

== Description ==
Glass Tea House – Kou-an revisits the very roots of Japanese culture through, and transcending time and space. This glass made teahouse does not feature traditional scrolls or Ikebana, Japanese flower arrangement, the usual embellishments associated with a teahouse. Instead, by using glass, the resulting architecture delights and confounds the eye, creating a glistening water surface under the shower of natural light, with light refracted by a crystal prism sculpture turning into a rainbow of 'flowers made of light'. In the absence of physical components, this 'architecture of light' reaches poetic and thought-provoking dimensions.

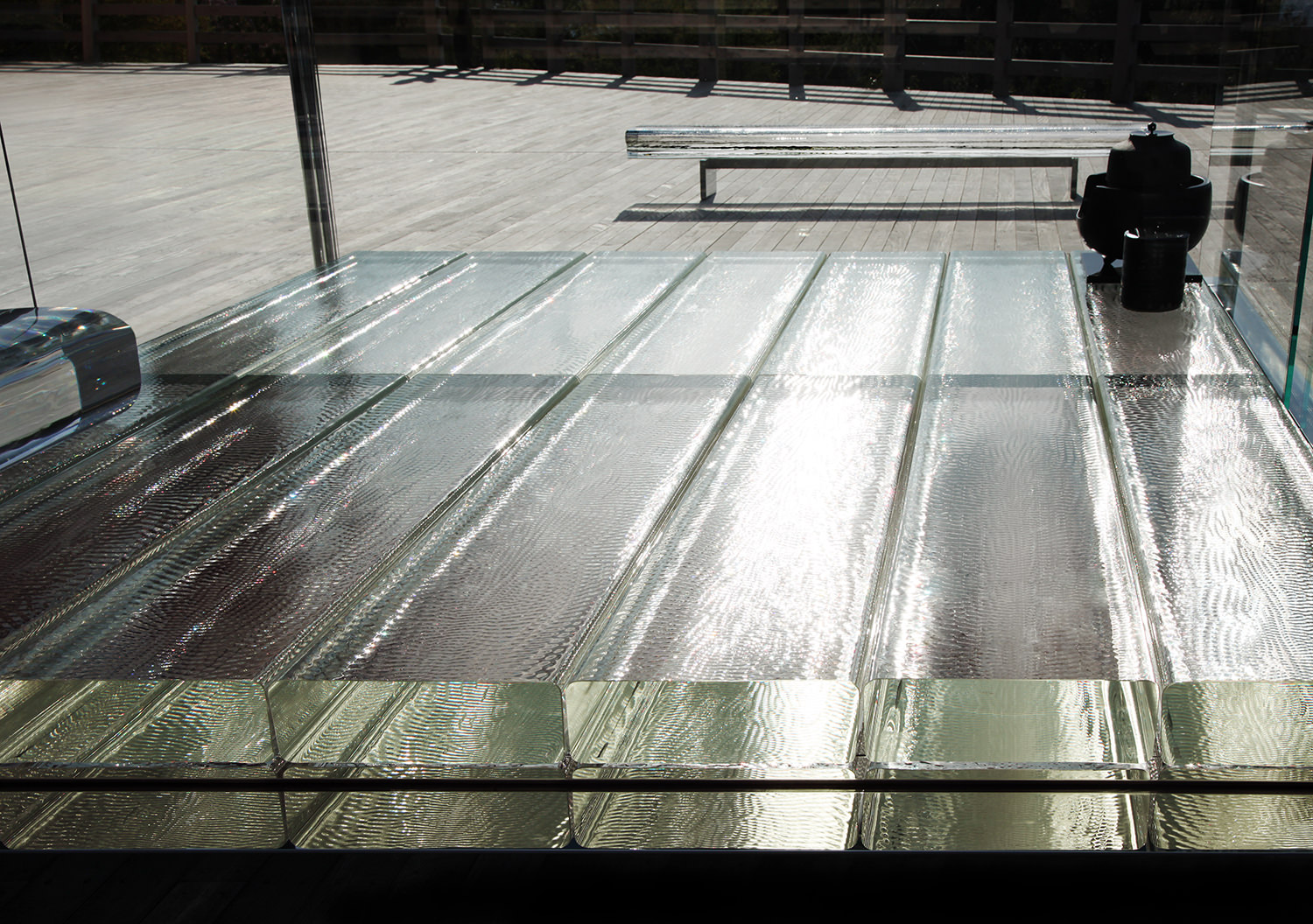
The glass floor recalls the glistening water surface under the shower of natural light.

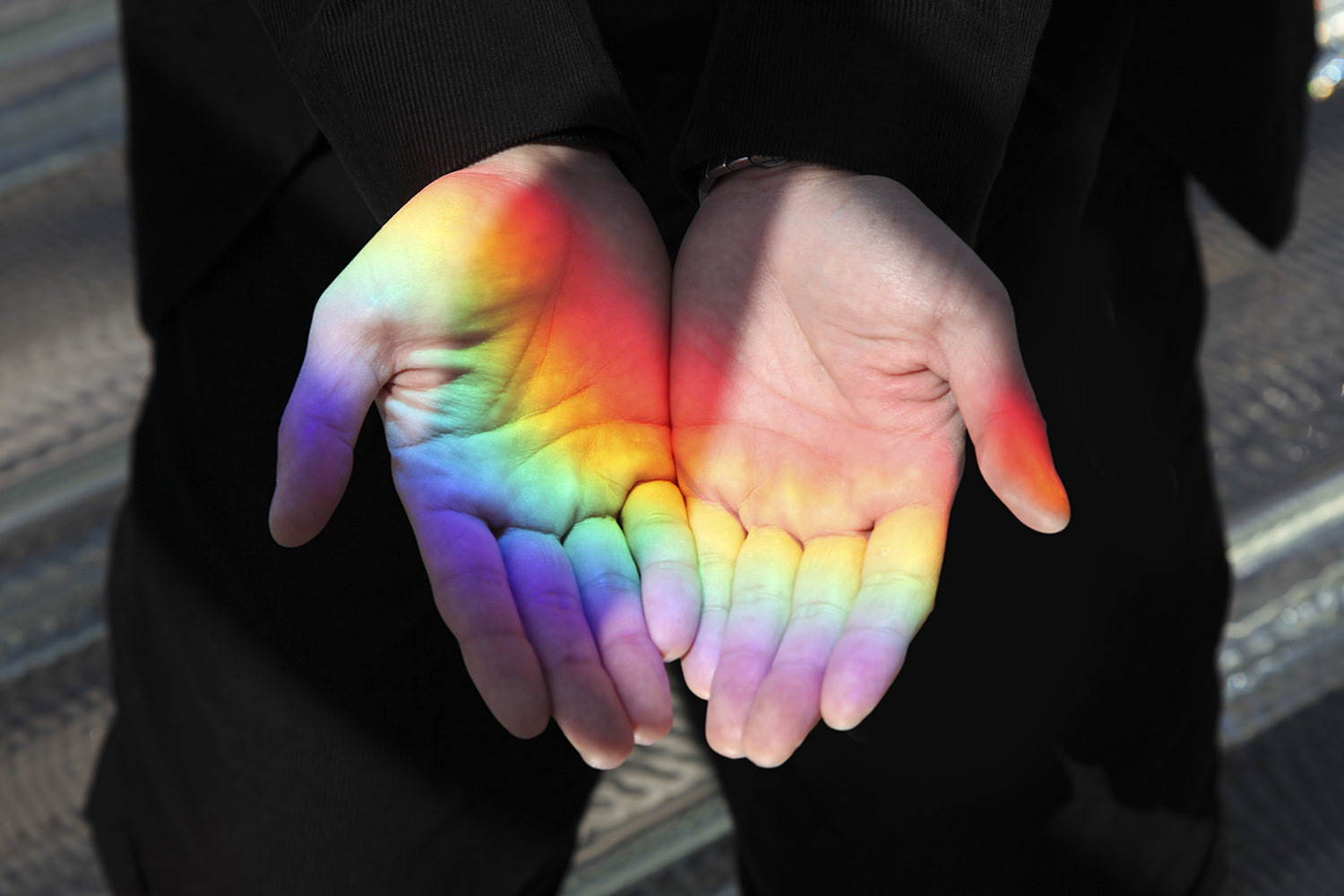
Light refracted by a crystal prism sculpture turns into a rainbow of 'flowers made of light'.

Unlike the traditional Japanese teahouse which is often described as a closed microcosm, Glass Tea House – Kou-an is composed of glass, and therefore shows different expressions with the influence of surrounding environment.

== Exhibitions ==
=== 'Glass Tea House – Kou-an' 2011, 54th Venice Biennale Glasstress 2011 (Venice, Italy) ===
The design of Glass Tea House – Kou-an was presented at the Glasstress 2011, the collateral event of the 54th Venice Biennale which is held in Venice every two years.

=== 'Glass Tea House – Kou-an' 2015–2017, the Shogunzuka Seiryu-den stage, Tendai Sect Shoren-in (Kyoto, Japan) ===
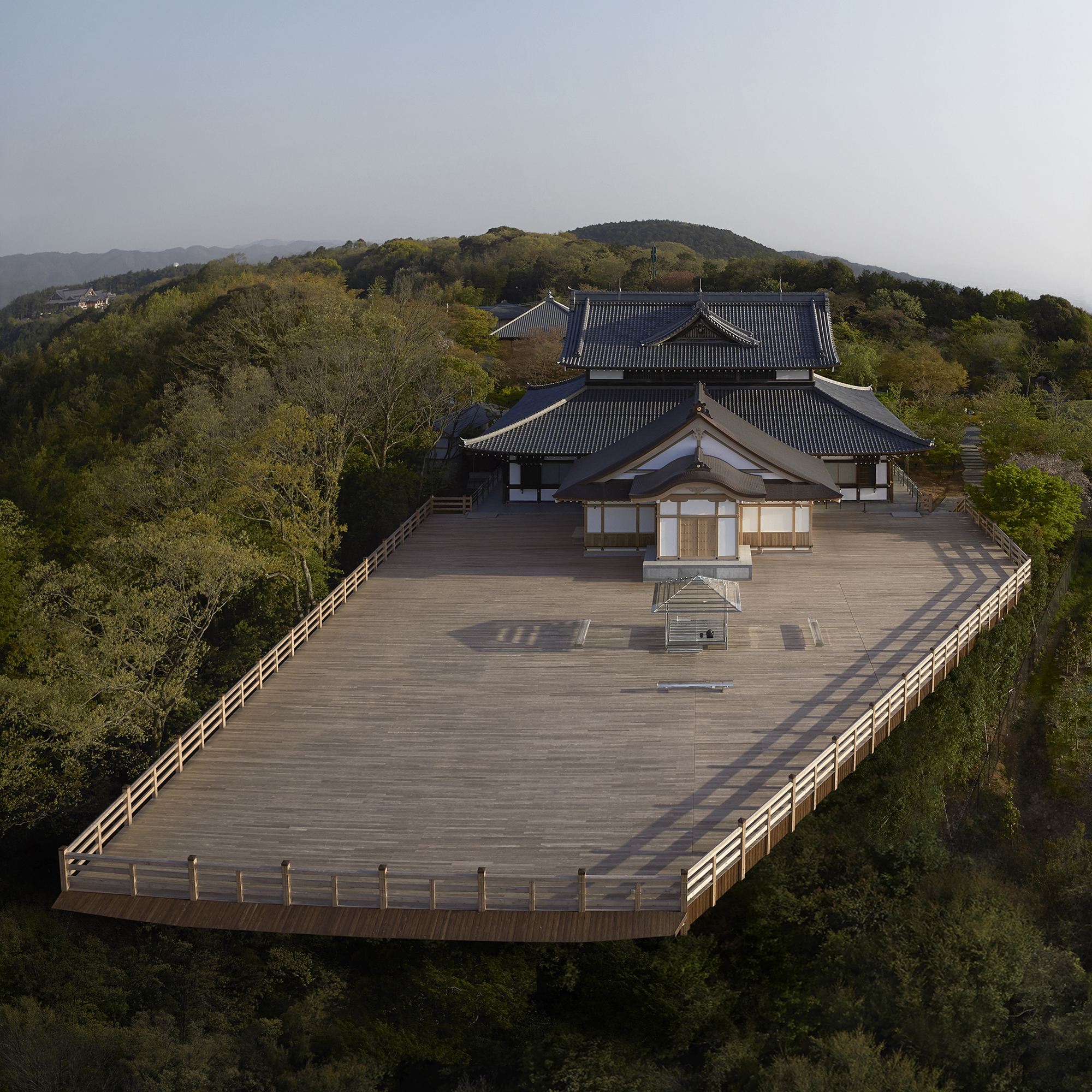
Glass Tea House - KOU-AN, 2015–2017, Tendai Sect Shōren-in

Shogunzuka is located on the peak of Mt. Higashiyama. Panoramic view of Kyoto could be observed from its deck where Glass Tea House – Kou-an was exhibited. In 794 when Emperor Kanmu was looking for a location to establish a new capital, he climbed to the area now known as Shogunzuka and decided to move the capital to Kyoto, and constructed Heian Kyo, a city where Japanese culture and art bloomed. Painting of the Blue Cetaka, a national treasure of Japan, is also dedicated to Shoren-in.

=== 'Tokujin Yoshioka Glass Tea House – Kou-an' 2018–2019, The Saga Prefectural Art Museum (Saga, Japan) ===
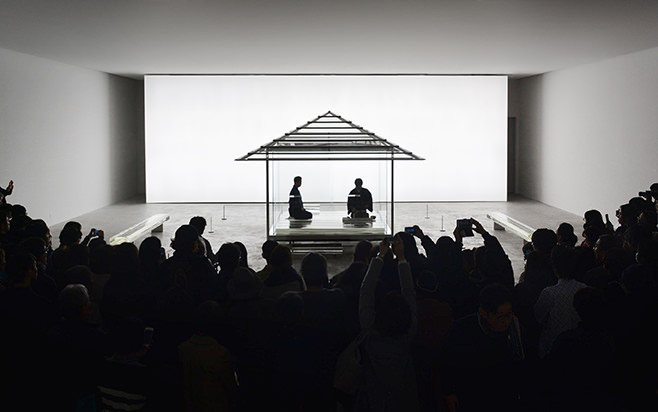
Tokujin Yoshioka Glass Tea House – Kou-an, 2018–2019, Saga Prefectural Art Museum

The installation of teahouse was showcased inside a white exhibition space along with some of Yoshioka’s renowned artworks such as Water Block, glass bench permanently displayed at the Musée d'Orsay, and Waterfall, glass table. Saga is Yoshioka’s home town, and in 2015 his exhibition Tokujin Yoshioka_Tornado was held in celebration of the museum's renewal.

=== 'Tokujin Yoshioka Glass Tea House - KOU-AN' 2019–2022, The National Art Center, Tokyo (Tokyo, Japan) ===
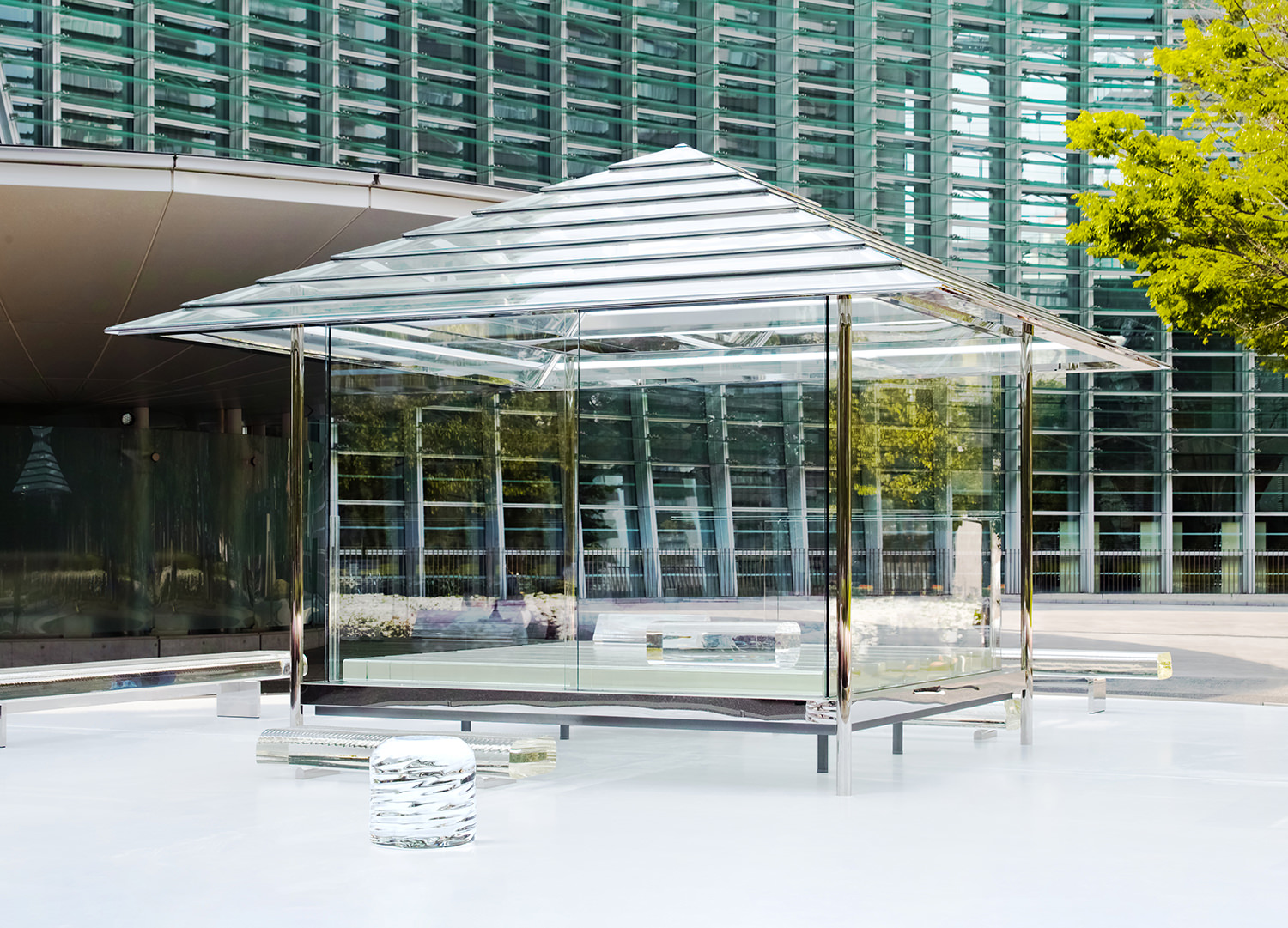
Tokujin Yoshioka Glass Tea House – Kou-an, 2019–2022, The National Art Center, Tokyo

The National Art Center, Tokyo which opened in 2007, is known for the beautiful wavelike glass wall façade designed by Kisho Kurokawa. Glass Tea House – Kou-an is exhibited at the main entrance of the art center along with Water Block, glass bench permanently displayed at Musée d'Orsay.

== Publication ==
TOKUJIN YOSHIOKA KOU-AN Glass Tea House, Kyuryudo, 2017
