= Sarumen Chaseki =

Historic Japanese tea house in Nagoya Castle

- 猿面茶席
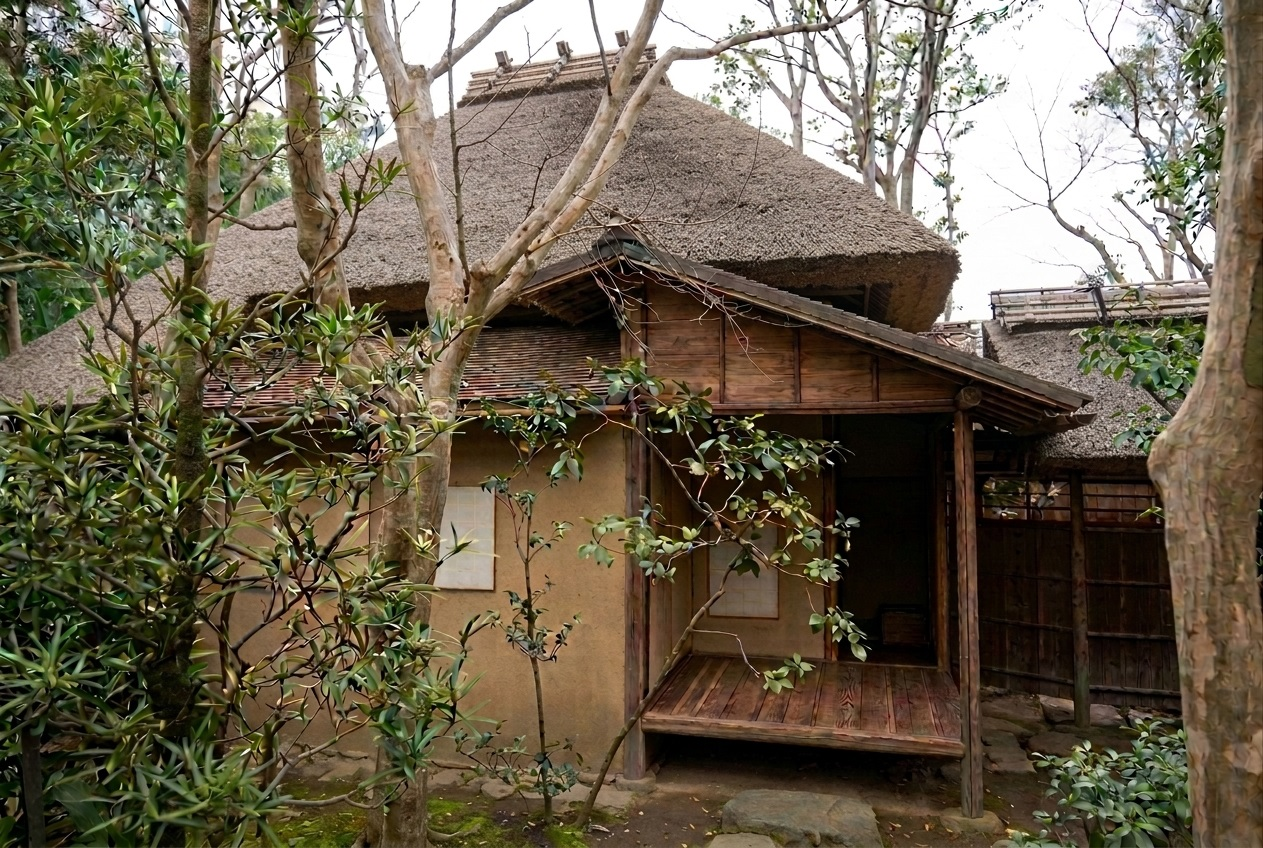
- colourised photograph, taken before 1945

General information
- Type: Chashitsu (tea house)
- Architectural style: Sukiya-zukuri
- Location: Nagoya Castle, Nagoya, Aichi Prefecture, Japan

Sarumen Chaseki (猿面茶席) is a historic Japanese tea house (chashitsu) located within the grounds of Nagoya Castle in Nagoya, Aichi Prefecture, Japan. Together with the adjacent Bōgaku Chaseki (望嶽茶席), it forms the Sarumen-Bōgaku tea complex. The tea house is regarded as one of the notable surviving examples of traditional tea architecture associated with early Edo-period castle culture.

== History ==
Floor plan of the Sarumen chaseki and the adjacent Bōgaku part

According to local tradition, Sarumen Chaseki was transferred to Nagoya during the construction of Nagoya Castle and is believed to have incorporated materials from Kiyosu Castle. Historical sources differ regarding its original designer. The Kinjō Onkoroku attributed the structure to Oda Urakusai, although the Nagoya Castle authorities note that definitive evidence has not been established.

The tea house was originally known simply as the O-sukiya ("Honorable Tea House") during the Edo period. The name Sarumen ("monkey face") derives from the tea room's tokobashira (alcove pillar 床柱) on the right side of the tokonoma, which contains two prominent knots resembling a face. According to legend Oda Nobunaga saw the pillar with the two knots and remarked to Toyotomi Hideyoshi that it looked like his face. Hideyoshi was called "little monkey" due to the appearance of his face. The current name is believed to have come into use after the Meiji Restoration, when the structure passed into private ownership.

In 1620, the building was relocated from the castle's Honmaru precinct to the Ninomaru precinct. It was incorporated as part of the Ninomaru Palace towards the garden side. Following the Meiji Restoration it was moved again, first to Tsuruma Park in 1929. The original tea house was designated as a national treasure in 1936. It was destroyed during the bombing of Nagoya during the Pacific War.

Prior to its destruction, detailed architectural surveys and plans had been prepared. These records enabled the faithful reconstruction of Sarumen Chaseki within the grounds of Nagoya Castle in 1949 (Shōwa 24). The reconstructed building preserves the traditional four-and-three-quarter mat (yojōhan daime) layout associated with classical tea-room design and remains part of the castle's cultural facilities.

The teahouse is used for various events and functions. A special type of tea ceremony is held in honour of Haruhime (1641–1658) where a very large chawan (大福茶碗) with a diameter of 34cm is held. The bowl can only be drunk with the assistance of two persons.

A faithful reproduction of the front part of the house is located in the Tokugawa Art Museum which showcases a rotating exhibit of Japanese tea utensils.

== See also ==
- Rokusō-an originally at Nara
- Hassō-an (八窓庵) originally at Osaka
