= Chashitsu =

Japanese tea house

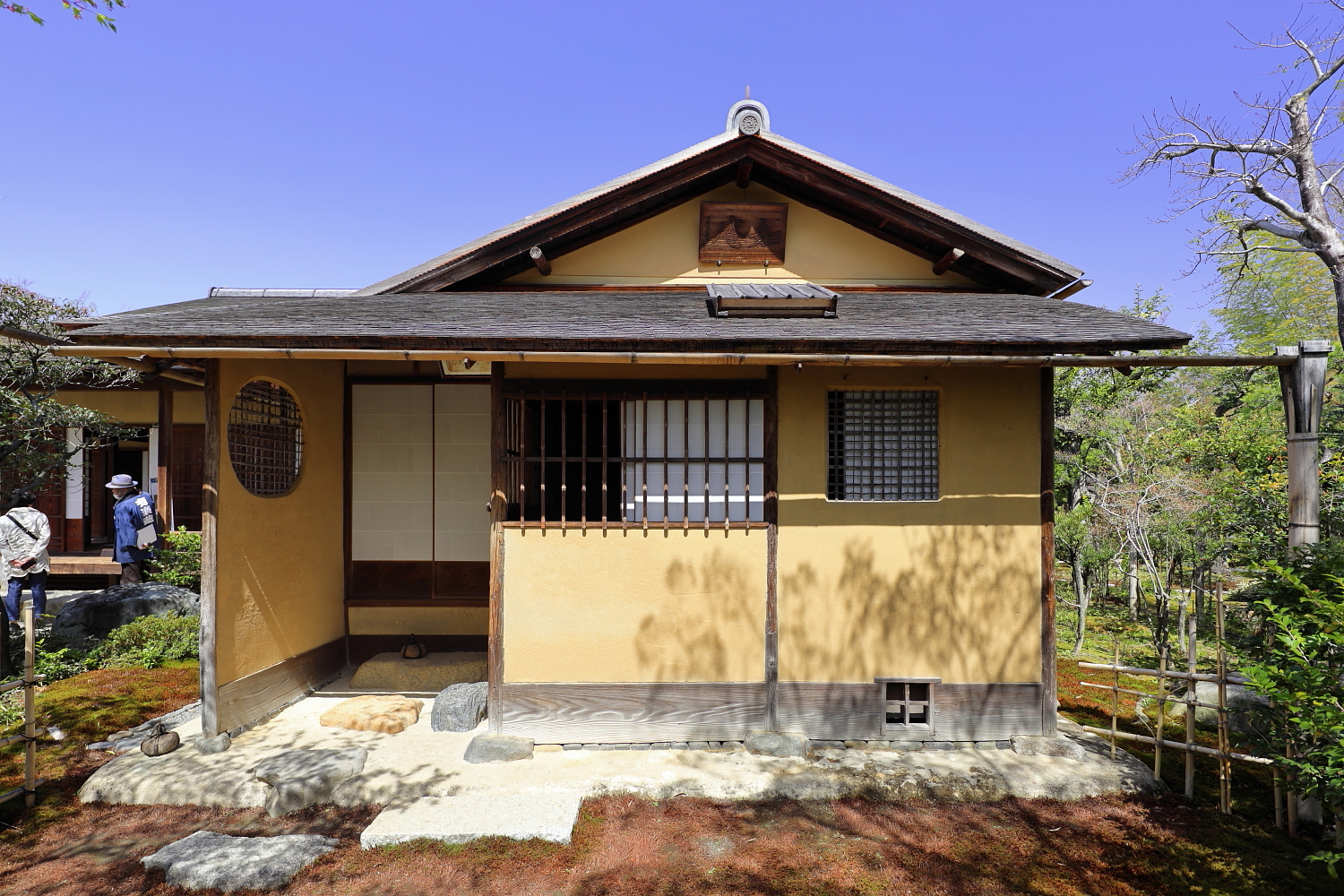
Jo-an is a chashitsu (tea house) and inscribed as a National Treasure.

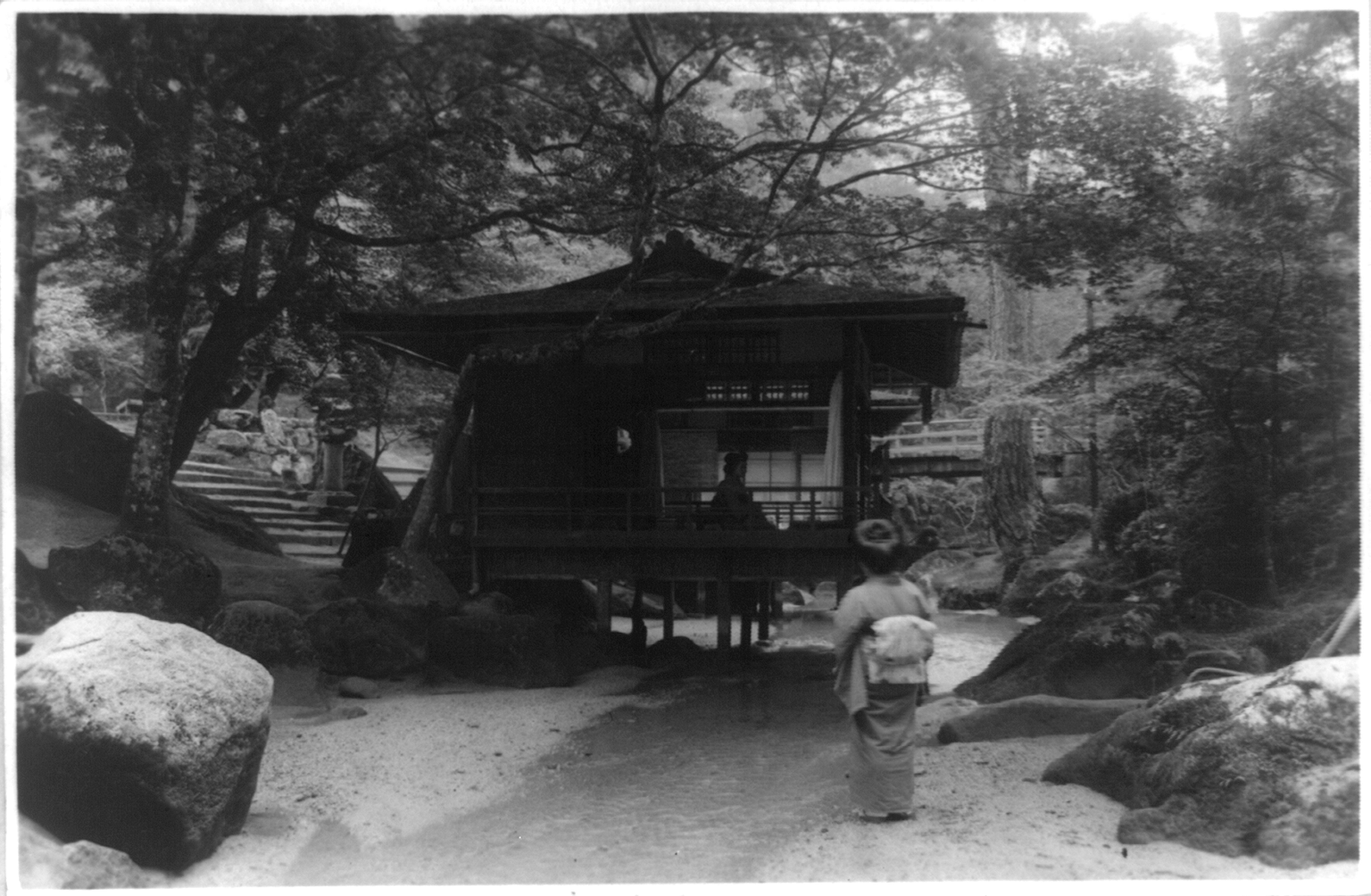
Chashitsu in its garden setting, Itsuku-shima, c. 1900

Chashitsu (茶室, 'tea room') in Japanese tradition is an architectural space designed to be used for tea ceremony (chanoyu) gatherings.

The architectural style that developed for chashitsu is referred to as the sukiya style (sukiya-zukuri), and the term sukiya (数奇屋) may be used as a synonym for chashitsu. Related Japanese terms are chaseki (茶席), broadly meaning "place for tea", and implying any sort of space where people are seated to participate in tea ceremony, and chabana, "tea flowers", the style of flower arrangement associated with the tea ceremony.

Typical features of chashitsu are shōji windows and sliding doors made of wooden lattice covered in a translucent Japanese paper; tatami mat floors; a tokonoma alcove; and simple, subdued colours and style. The most typical floor size of a chashitsu is 4.5 tatami mats (7.4 m^{2}; 80 sq ft).

== Definition ==
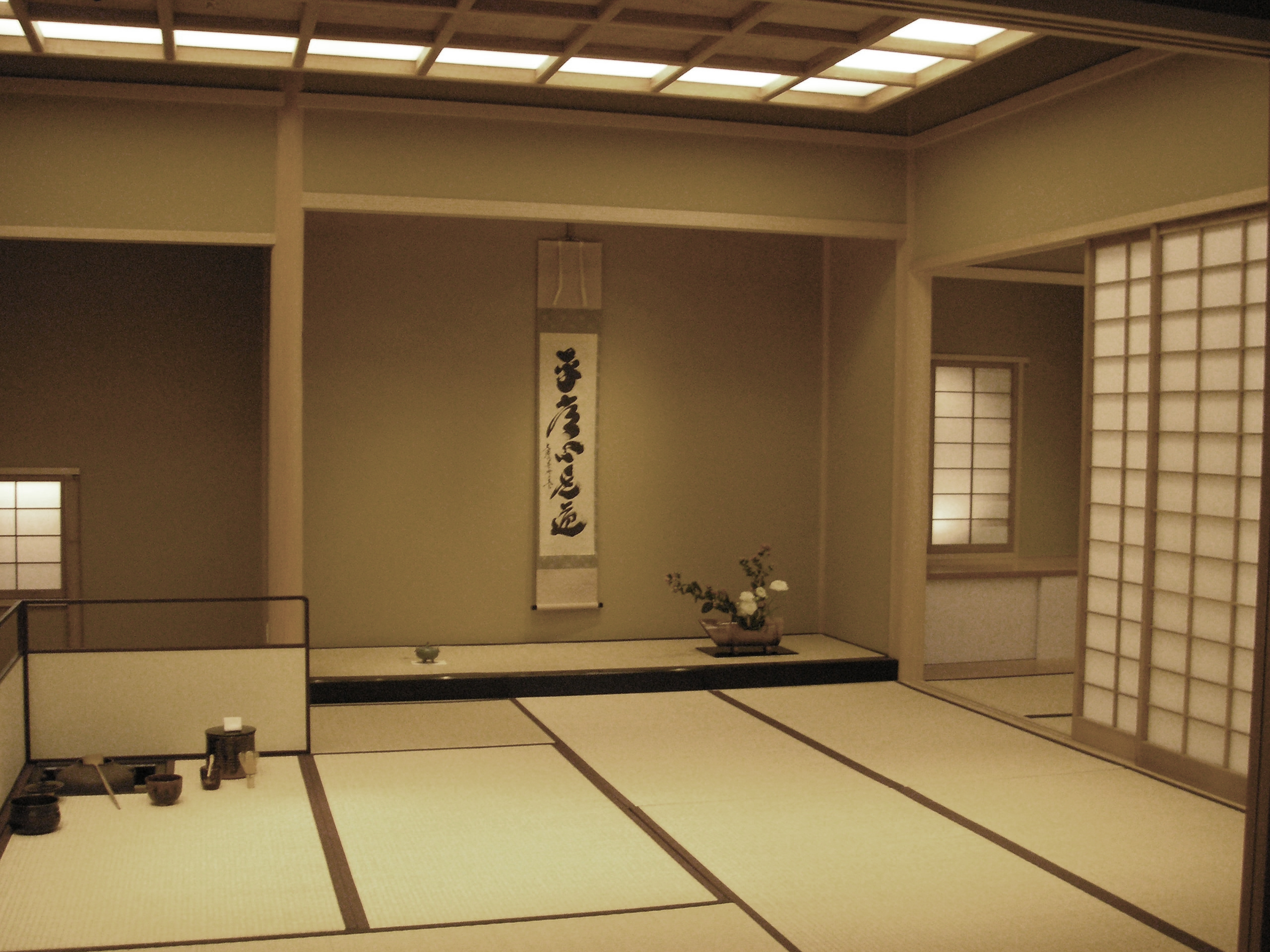
Interior view of a tea room

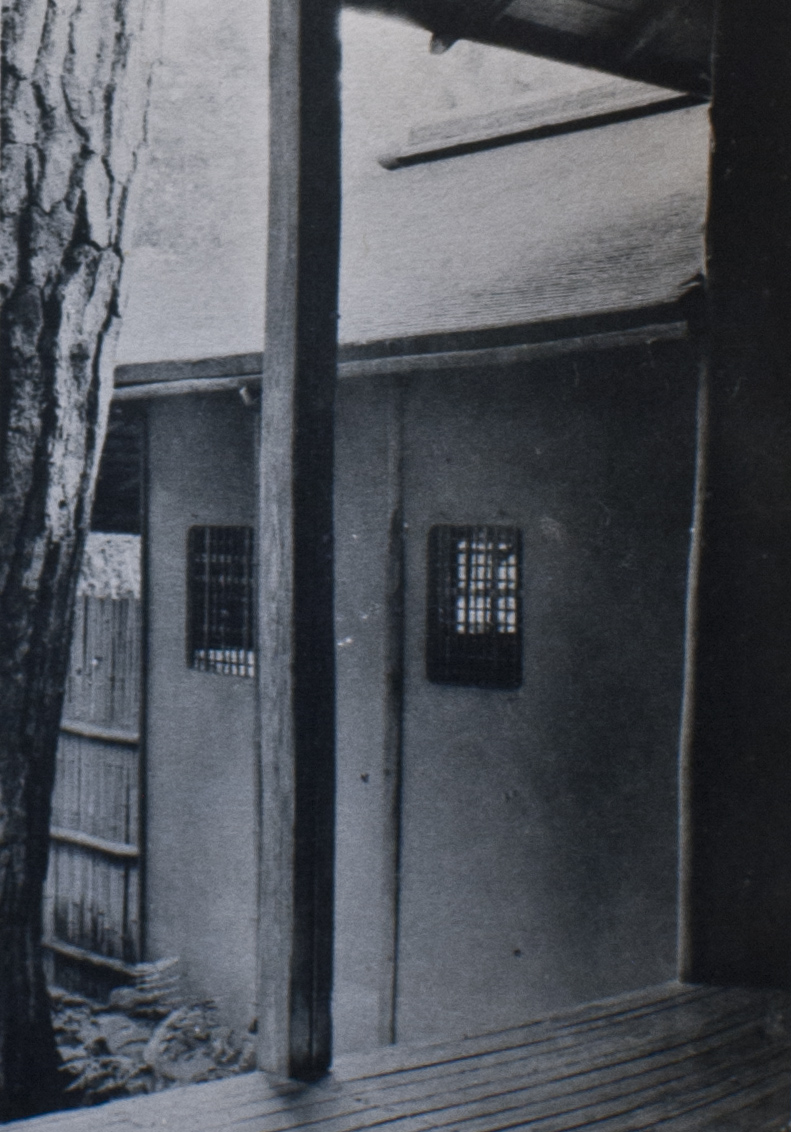
Tai-an (待庵), the only extant chashitsu designed by Sen no Rikyū, representing his concept of wabi-cha. Located in Myōki-an in Ōyamazaki, Kyoto (National Treasure)

In Japanese, free-standing structures specifically designed for exclusive tea ceremony use, as well as individual rooms intended for tea ceremony, are both referred to as chashitsu. The term may be used to indicate the tea room itself where the guests are received, or that room and its attached facilities, even extending to the roji garden path leading to it. In English, a distinction is often made between free-standing structures for tea, referred to as tea houses, and rooms used for tea ceremony incorporated within other structures.

Tea houses are usually small, simple wooden buildings. They are located in the gardens or grounds of private homes. Other common sites are the grounds of temples, museums, and parks. The smallest tea house will have two rooms: the main room where the host and guests gather and tea is served, and a mizuya, where the host prepares the sweets and equipment. The entire structure may have a total floor area of only three tatami mats.

Very large tea houses may have several tea rooms of different sizes; a large, well-equipped mizuya resembling a modern kitchen; a large waiting room for guests; a welcoming area where guests are greeted and can remove and store their shoes; separate toilets for men and women; a changing room; a storage room; and possibly several anterooms as well as a garden with a roji path, an outdoor waiting area for guests and one or more privies.

Tea rooms are purpose-built spaces for holding tea gatherings. They may be located within larger tea houses, or within private homes or other structures not intended for tea ceremony. A tea room may have a floor area as small as 1.75 tatami mats (one full tatami mat for the guests plus a tatami mat called a daime (台目), about 3/4 the length of a full tatami mat, for the portable brazier (furo) or sunken hearth (ro) to be situated and the host to sit and prepare the tea); or as large as 10 tatami mats or more; 4.5 mats is generally considered the ideal in modern tea rooms. A tea room will usually contain a tokonoma and a sunken hearth for preparing tea in the winter.

== History ==
The term chashitsu came into use after the start of the Edo period (c. 1600). In earlier times, various terms were used for spaces used for tea ceremony, such as chanoyu zashiki (茶湯座敷, "sitting room for chanoyu"), sukiya (place for poetically inclined aesthetic pursuits [fūryū, 風流]) such as chanoyu), and kakoi (囲, "partitioned-off space"). An account stated that it was the shogun Ashikaga Yoshimasa who built the first chashitsu at his Higashiyama villa in Kyoto. It was described as a small room of four-and-a-half tatami and was separated from the main residence.

According to Japanese historian Moriya Takeshi in his article "The Mountain Dwelling Within the City", the ideal of wabi-style tea ceremony (wabi-cha) had its roots in the urban society of the Muromachi period (1336 to 1573), and took form in the tea houses that townspeople built at their residences and which affected the appearance of thatched huts in mountain villages. Before this, tea ceremony was generally enjoyed in rooms built in the shoin-zukuri architectural style, a style still frequently employed today.

Tea houses first appeared in the Sengoku period (mid-15th century to early 17th century), a time in which the central government had almost no practical power, the country was in chaos, and wars and uprisings were commonplace. Seeking to reclaim Japan, samurai were busy acquiring and defending territories, promoting trade and overseeing the output of farms, mills and mines as de facto rulers, and many of the poor were eager to seek the salvation of the afterlife as taught by Buddhism. Tea houses were built mostly by Zen monks or by daimyōs, samurai, and merchants who practiced tea ceremony. They sought simplicity and tranquility – central tenets of Zen philosophy. The acknowledgment of simplicity and plainness, which is a central motivation of the tea house, continued to remain as a distinct Japanese tradition in the later periods.

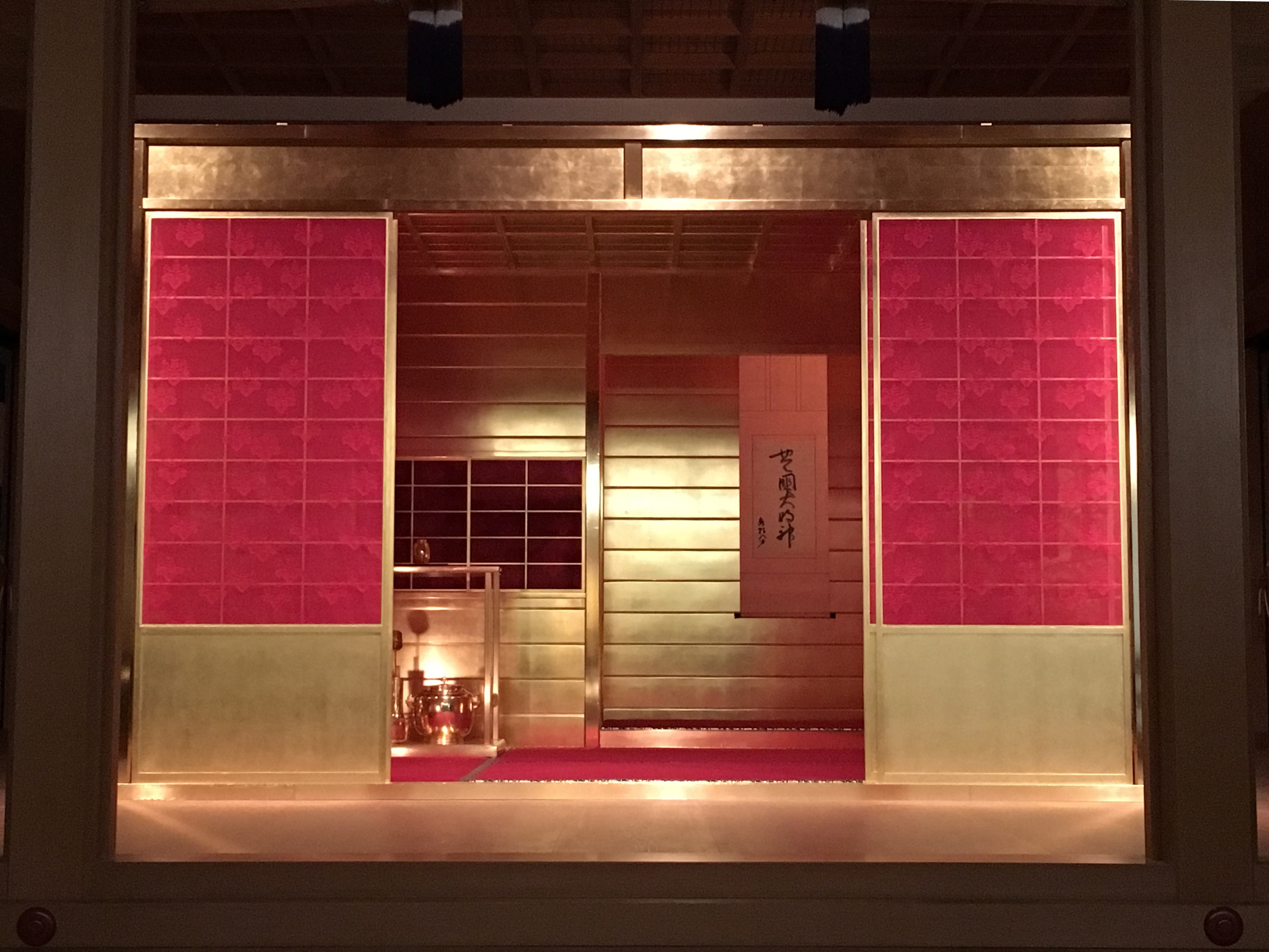
The Golden Tea Room (MOA Museum of Art)

The Golden Tea Room (黄金の茶室, Ōgon no chashitsu) was a portable gilded chashitsu constructed during the 16th century Azuchi–Momoyama period for the Japanese regent Lord Toyotomi Hideyoshi's tea ceremonies. The original room is lost, but a number of reconstructions have been made. The Golden Tea Room was constructed to impress guests with the might and power of the regent. This was in contrast to the rustic aesthetics codified under his tea master Sen no Rikyū, although it is speculated that Rikyū might have helped in the design. The room's opulence was highly unusual and may have also been against wabi-sabi norms. At the same time, the simplicity of the overall design with its clean lines could be seen as within the canon. The extent of teamaster Rikyū's involvement in the design of the room is not known, however he was in attendance on a number of occasions when tea was being served to guests in the room.

== Architecture ==
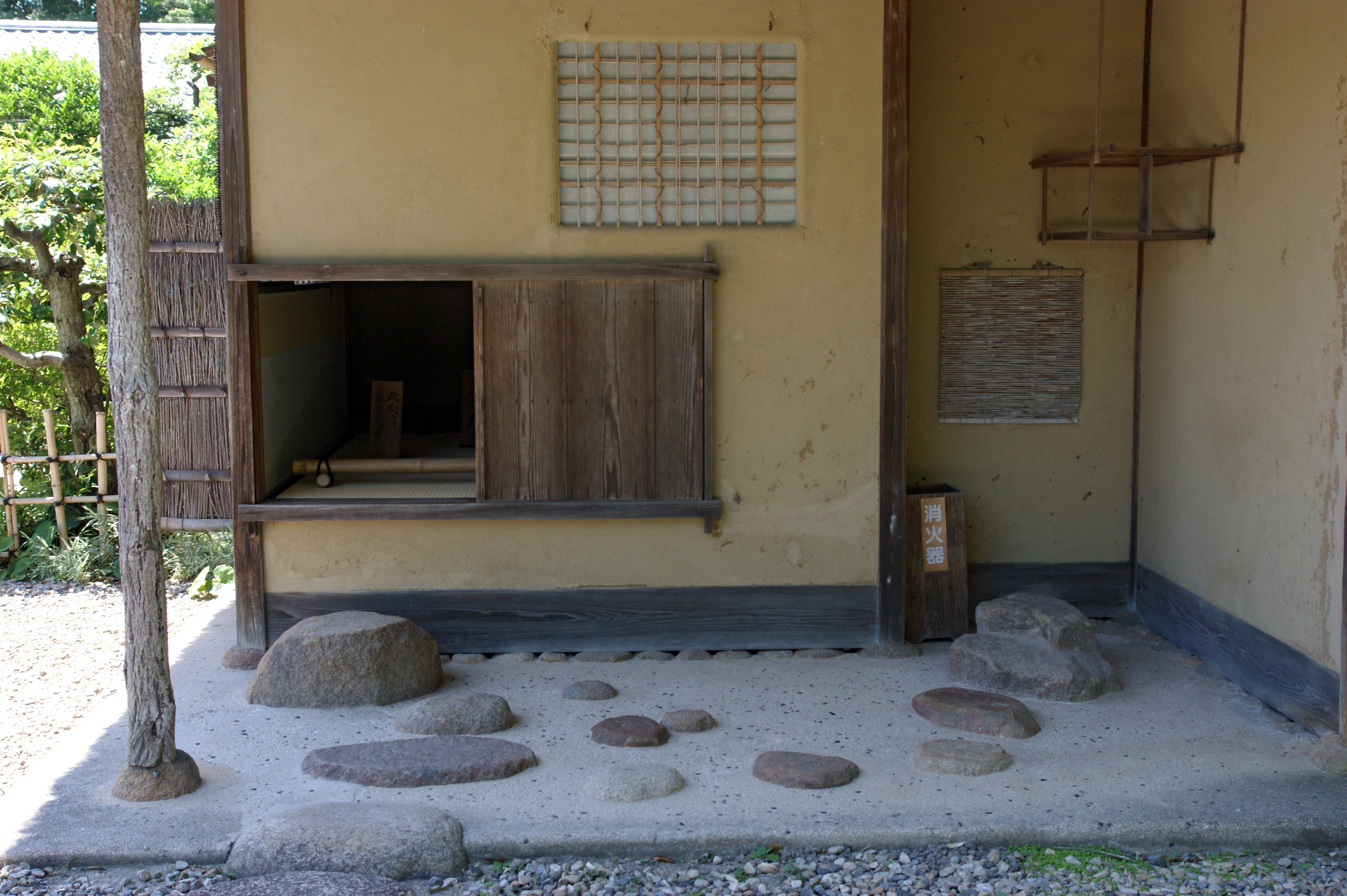
Nijiriguchi entrance of a tea house

The ideal free-standing tea house is surrounded by a small garden having a path leading to the tea room. This garden is called roji (露地, "dewy ground") and is divided into two parts by a gate called chumon. Along the path is a waiting bench for guests and a privy. Aside from its own garden, the chashitsu is arranged – along with other pavilions such as the zashiki, oku no zashiki, and hanare zashiki – around a larger primary garden.

There is a stone water-basin near the tea house, where the guests rinse their hands and mouths before entering the tea room through a low, square door called nijiriguchi, or "crawling-in entrance", which requires bending low to pass through and symbolically separates the small, simple, quiet inside from the crowded, overwhelming outside world. The nijiriguchi leads directly into the tea room.

The tea room has a low ceiling and no furniture: the guests and host sit seiza-style on the floor. All materials used are intentionally simple and rustic. Besides the guests' entrance, there may be several more entrances; at minimum there is an entrance for the host known as the sadōguchi, which allows access to the mizuya. Windows are generally small and covered with shōji, which allows natural light to filter in. The windows are not intended to provide a view to the outside, which would detract from the participants' concentration. There is a sunken hearth (炉 ro) located in the tatami adjacent to the host's tatami, for use in the cold months; this hearth is covered with a plain tatami and is not visible in the warm months, when a portable brazier (風炉 furo) is used instead.

There will be a tokonoma (scroll alcove) holding a scroll of calligraphy or brush painting, and perhaps a small, simple, flower arrangement called a chabana (茶花), but no other decoration.

Layout of an ideal 4.5 tearoom with tokonoma and mizuya dōko

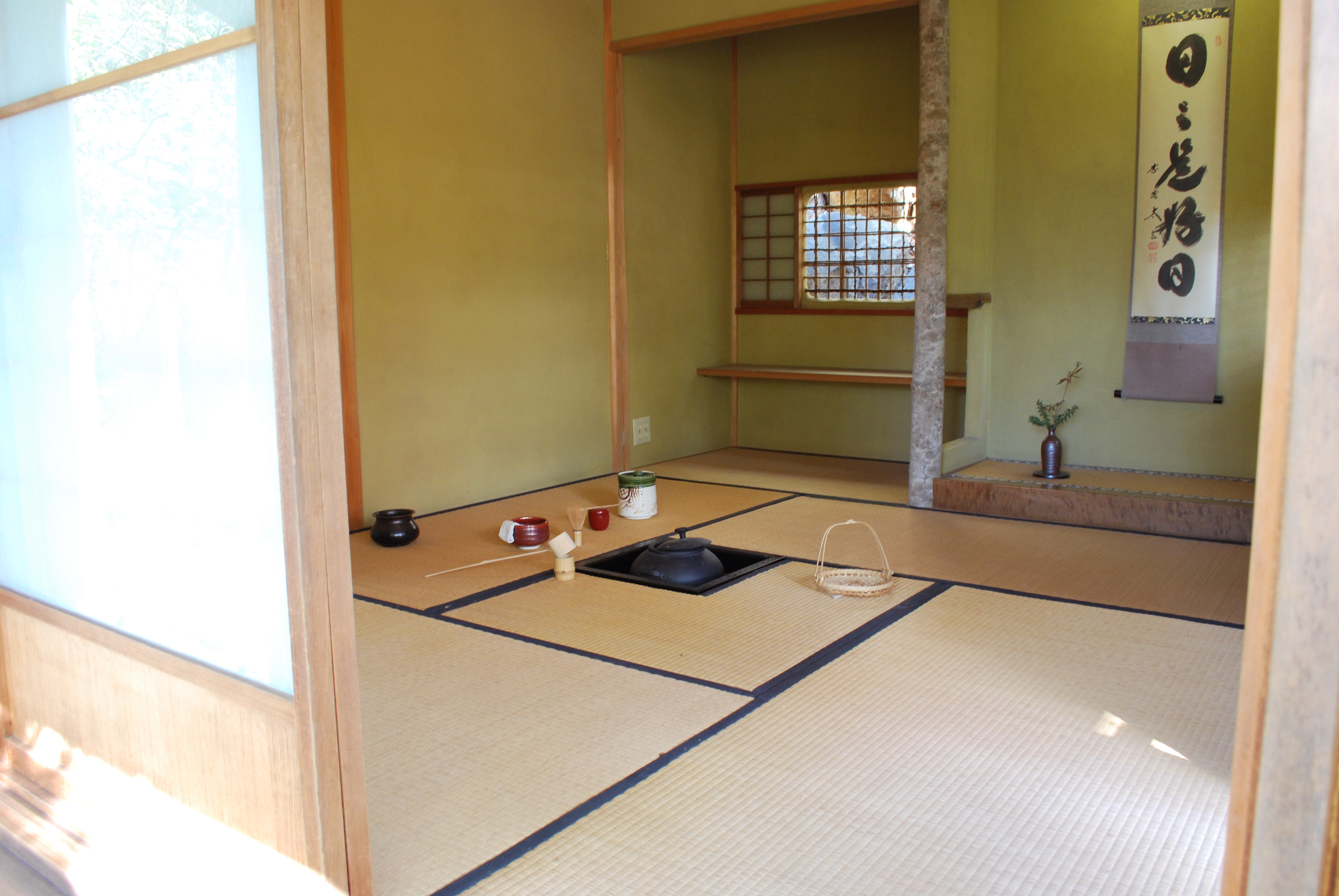
View of a similar interior, with some utensils

Chashitsu are broadly classified according to whether they have a floor area larger or smaller than 4.5 tatami, a differentiation which affects the style of ceremony that can be conducted, the specific type of equipment and decoration that can be used, the placement of various architectural features and the hearth, and the number of guests that can be accommodated. Chashitsu which are larger than 4.5 mats are called hiroma ("big room"), while those that are smaller are called koma ("small room"). Hiroma often are shoin style rooms, and for the most part are not limited to use for chanoyu.

Other factors that affect the tea room are architectural constraints such as the location of windows, entrances, the sunken hearth and the tokonoma, particularly when the tea room is not located within a purpose-built structure. The other factors that influence the construction of the chashitsu as a space in the iemoto are the iconography of the past and the memory of particular individuals.

Not all tea rooms can be made to conform to the ideal seen in the image.

== Typical names ==
It is usual for chashitsu to be given a name after their owners or benefactors. Names usually include the character for "hut" (庵, an), "hall" (堂, dō), or "arbour"/"pavilion" (亭, tei), and reflect the spirit of rustic simplicity of the tea ceremony and the teachings of Zen Buddhism. Characteristic names include:

- Mugai-an (無外庵, Introvert Hut)
- Mokurai-an (黙雷庵, Silent Thunder Hut)
- Tōkyū-dō (東求堂, East-Seeking Hall) (note: the 東求堂 at Ginkaku-ji is pronounced Tōgu-dō, and is a private Buddhist hall, not a chashitsu)
- Shō-an (松庵, Pine Hut)
- Ichimoku-an (一木庵, One Tree Hut)
- Rokusō-an (六窓庵, Six Window Hut)
- Bōji-tei (忘路亭, Forgotten Path Arbour)

== Notable chashitsu ==
- Tai-an (待庵) built in 1582, is the only extant chashitsu designed by Sen no Rikyū, representing his concept of wabi-cha. Located at Myōki-an temple in Yamazaki, Kyoto. Designated a National Treasure.
- Jo-an (如庵) was built in Kyoto in 1618 by Urakusai, the younger brother of Oda Nobunaga, and was moved to Inuyama in Aichi in 1972. It was designated a National Treasure in 1951.
- Konnichi-an (今日庵, Today Hut) built by Sen Sōtan at what later became known as the Urasenke Konnichian estate. The floor space is composed of but one full tatami, a 3/4-size daime tatami, and a wooden board at the head of the daime tatami. There is no recessed tokonoma.
- Fushin-an (不審庵, Doubting Hut) by Sen no Rikyū. It was moved by his son Sen Shōan to the Omotesenke estate.
- Zangetsu-tei (残月亭, Morning Moon Arbour) belongs to the Omotesenke school in Kyoto
- San-meiseki (三名席, Three Famous Tearooms):
  - Sarumen Chaseki (猿面, Monkey face tea place) at Nagoya Castle, former National Treasure until its destruction in 1945, rebuilt in 1949
  - Yatsu-mado no seki (八窓の席, Eight Windows) or Hasō-an (八窓庵) at Isshin-ji in Osaka, designed by Lord Kobori Enshū (1579–1647)
  - Rokusō-an (六窓庵, Six Window Hut) from Kōfuku-ji in Nara, now in the gardens of the Tokyo National Museum
- Shōkin-tei (松琴亭) at Katsura Imperial Villa in Kyoto
- Golden Tea Room constructed under the regent Toyotomi Hideyoshi (1537–1598)
- Glass Tea House - KOU-AN (光庵, Light Hut) designed by Tokujin Yoshioka (b. 1967)
- Ki-an bamboo tea house
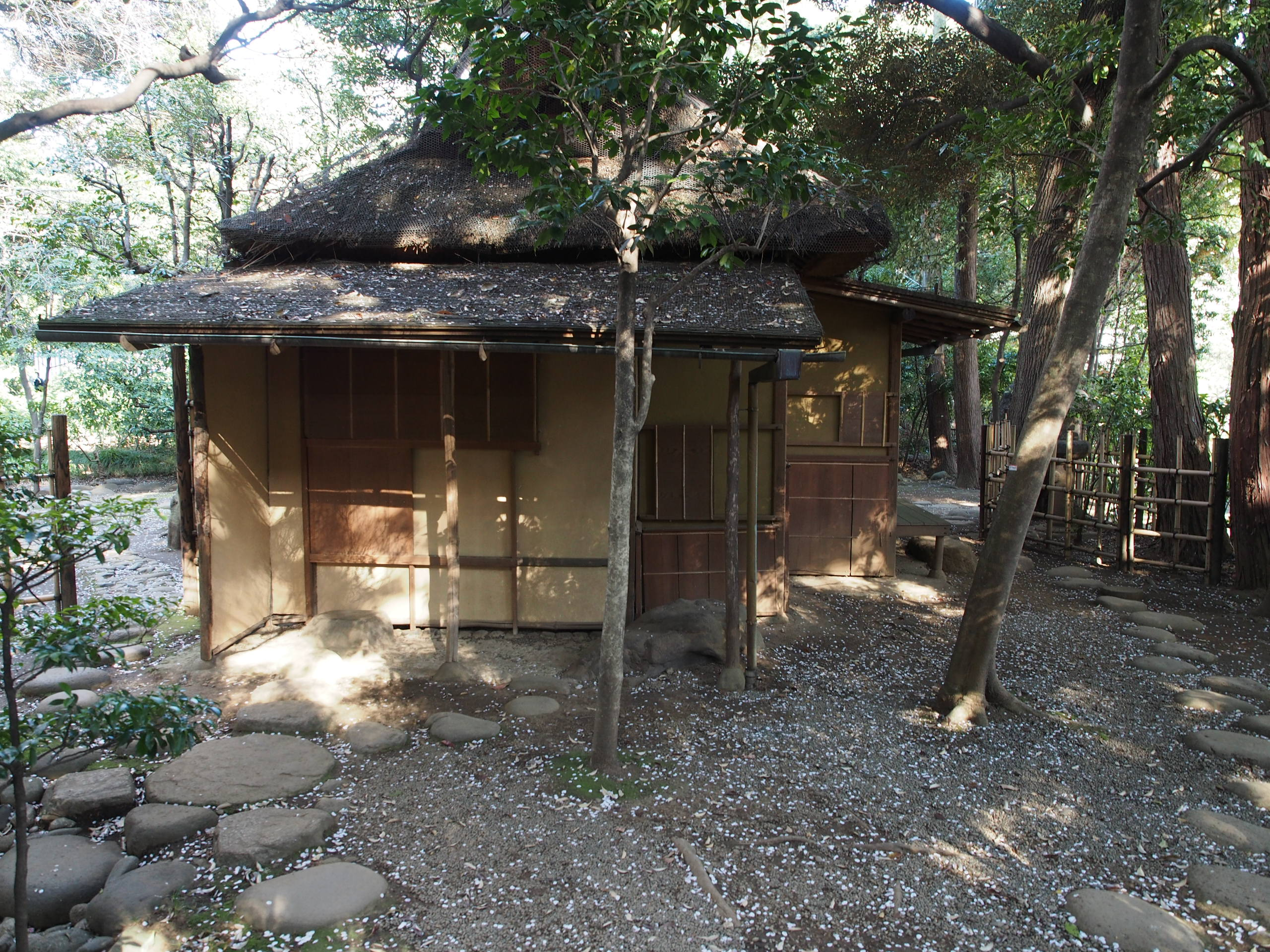
Rokusō-an, formerly from Kōfuku-ji in Nara

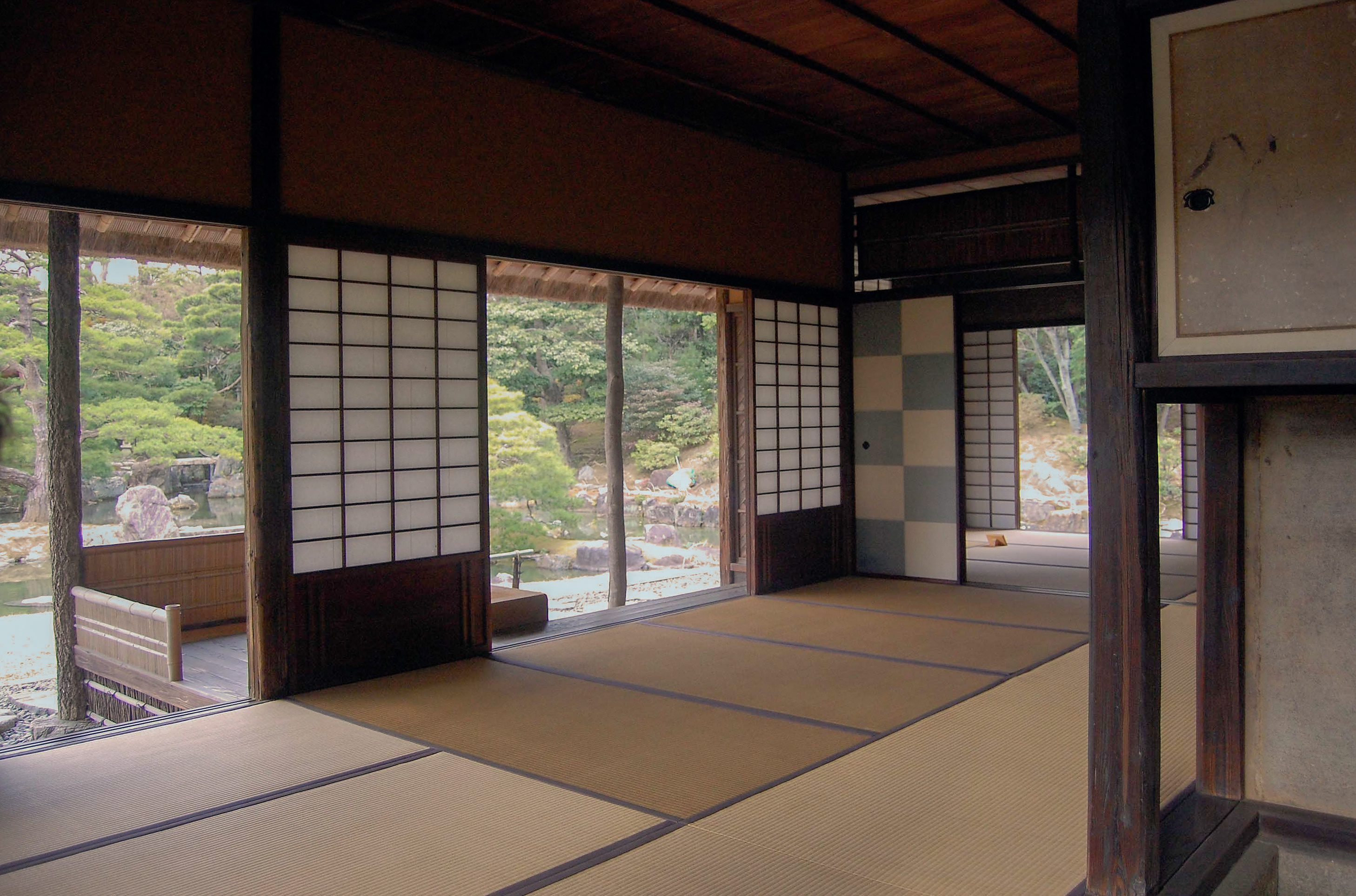
Interior of Shōkin-tei at Katsura Imperial Villa

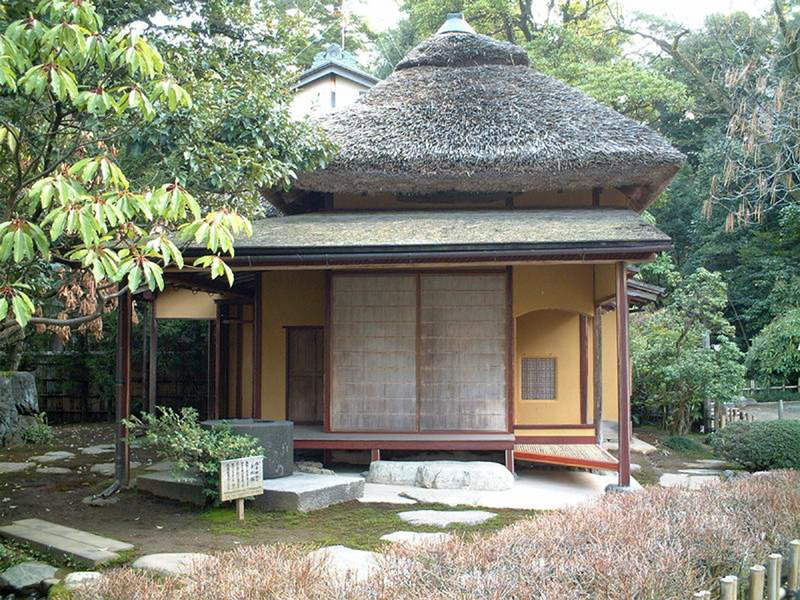
Yugao-tei in Kanazawa, Ishikawa

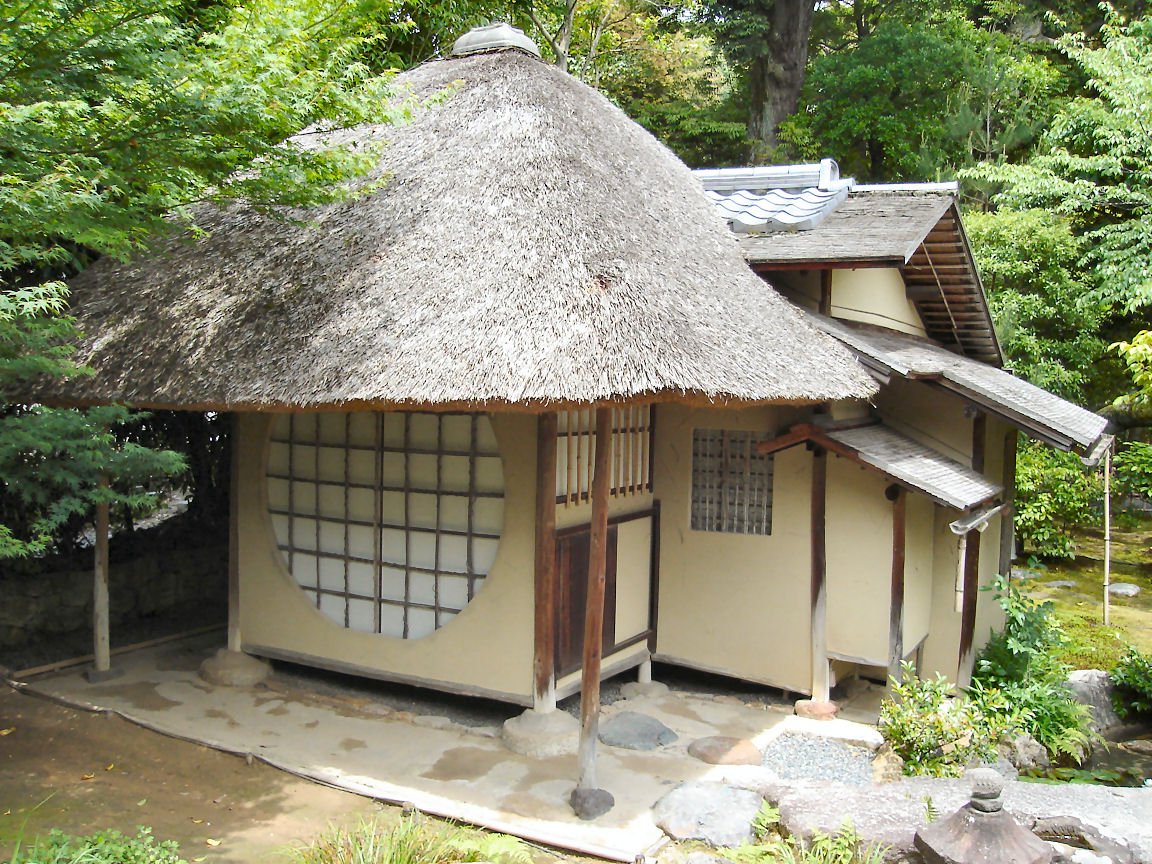
Iho-an at Kōdai-ji, Kyoto

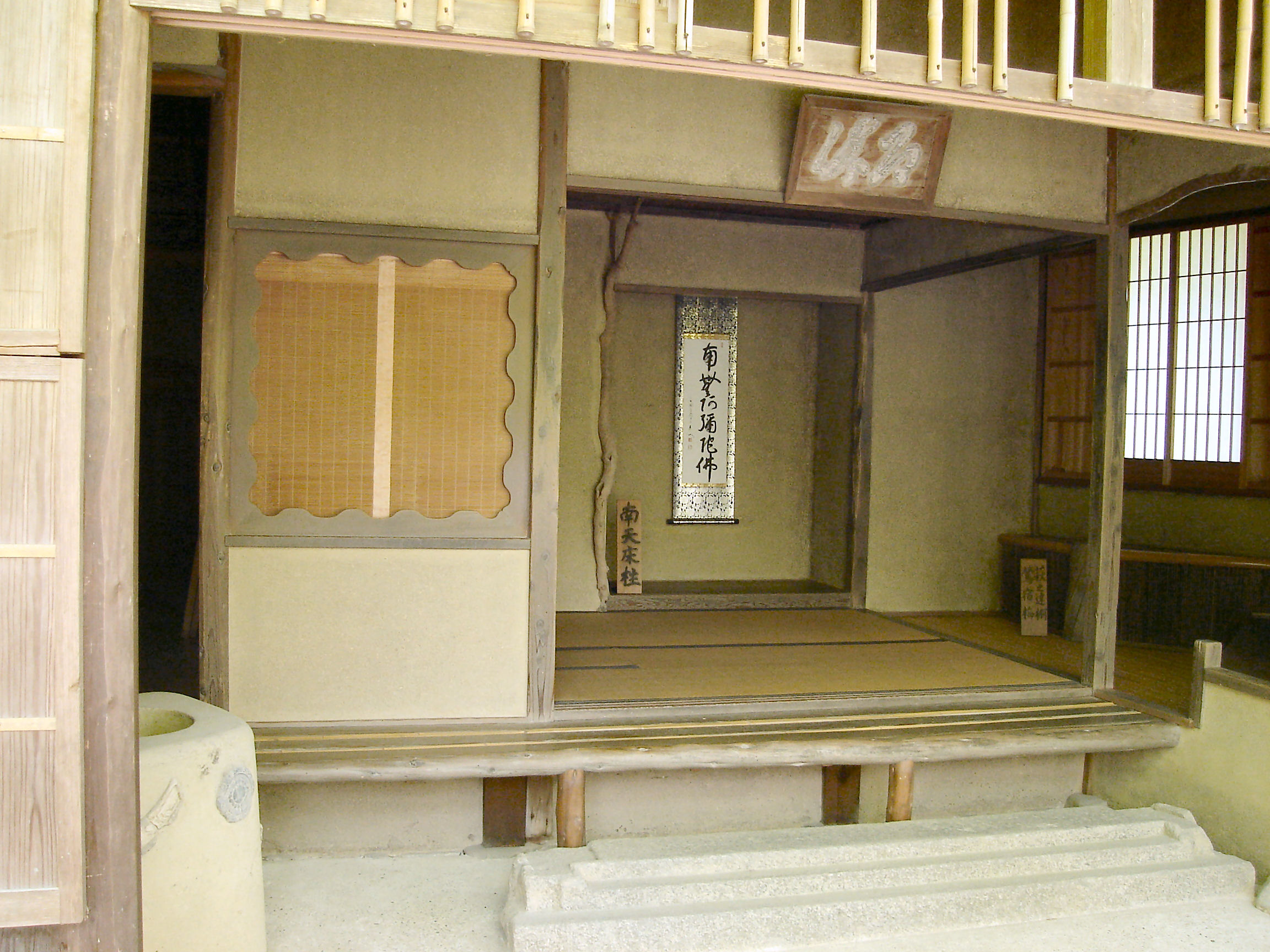
Sekka-tei at Rokuon-ji

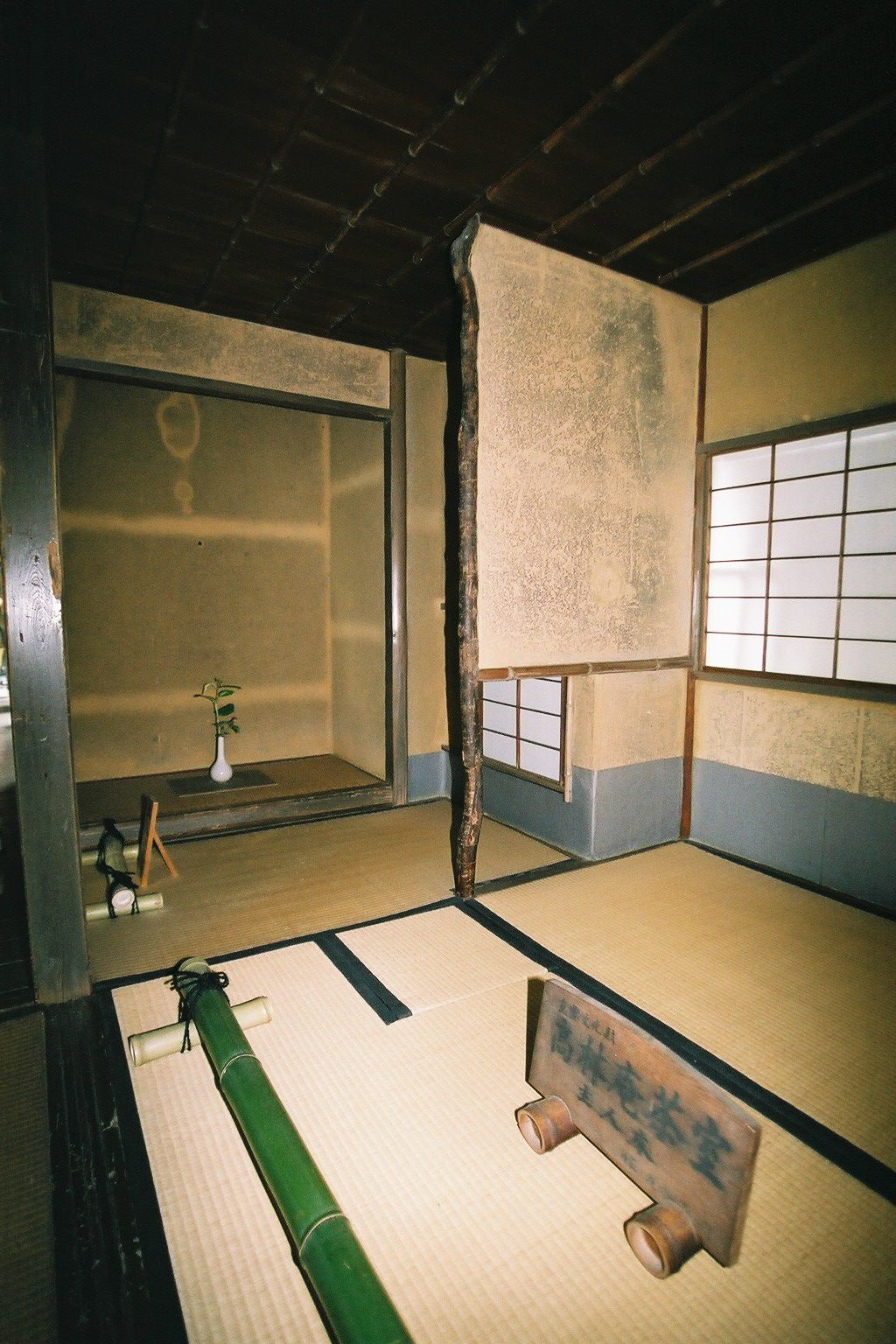
Kōrin-an at Jikō-in, Nara

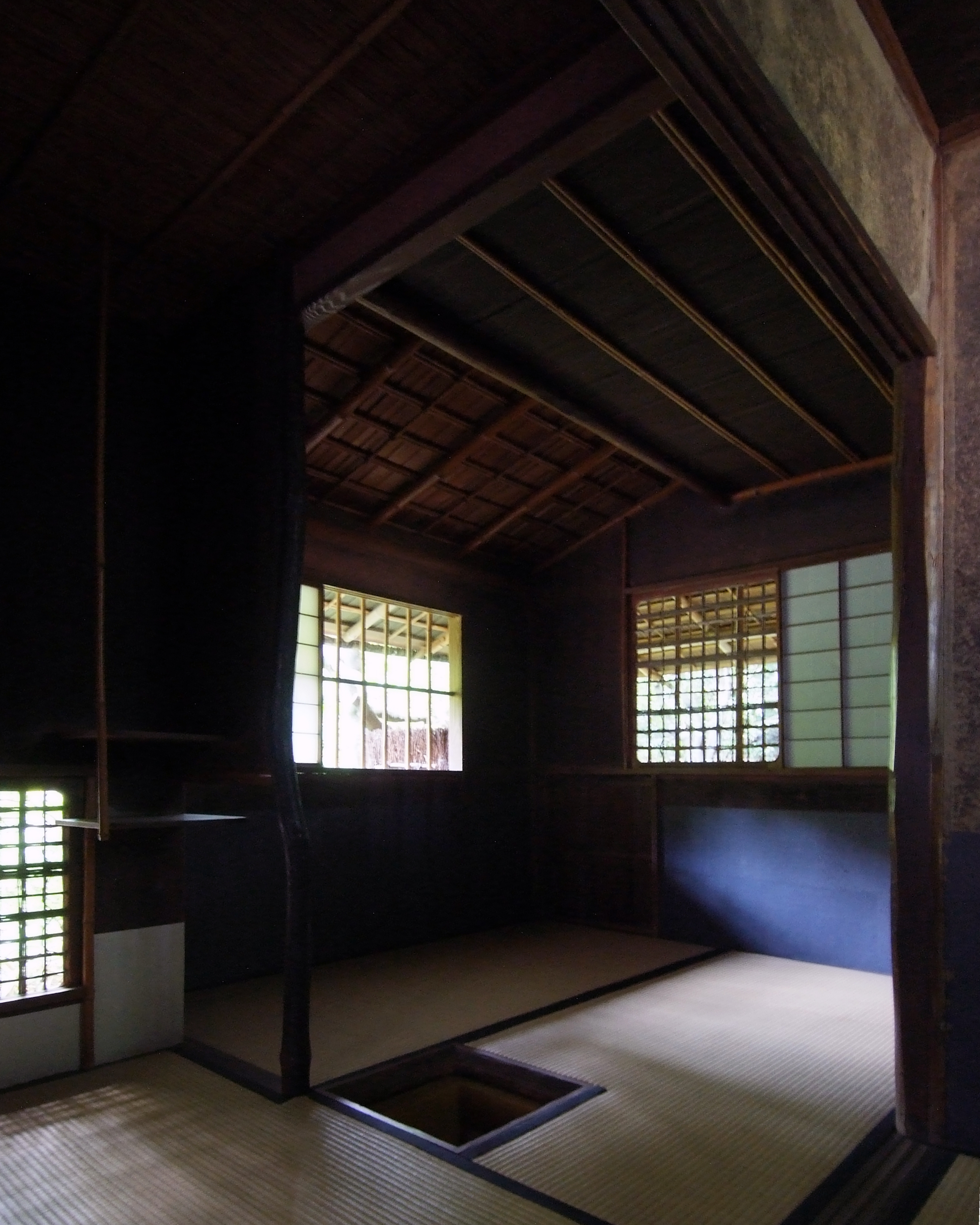
Shōkō-ken

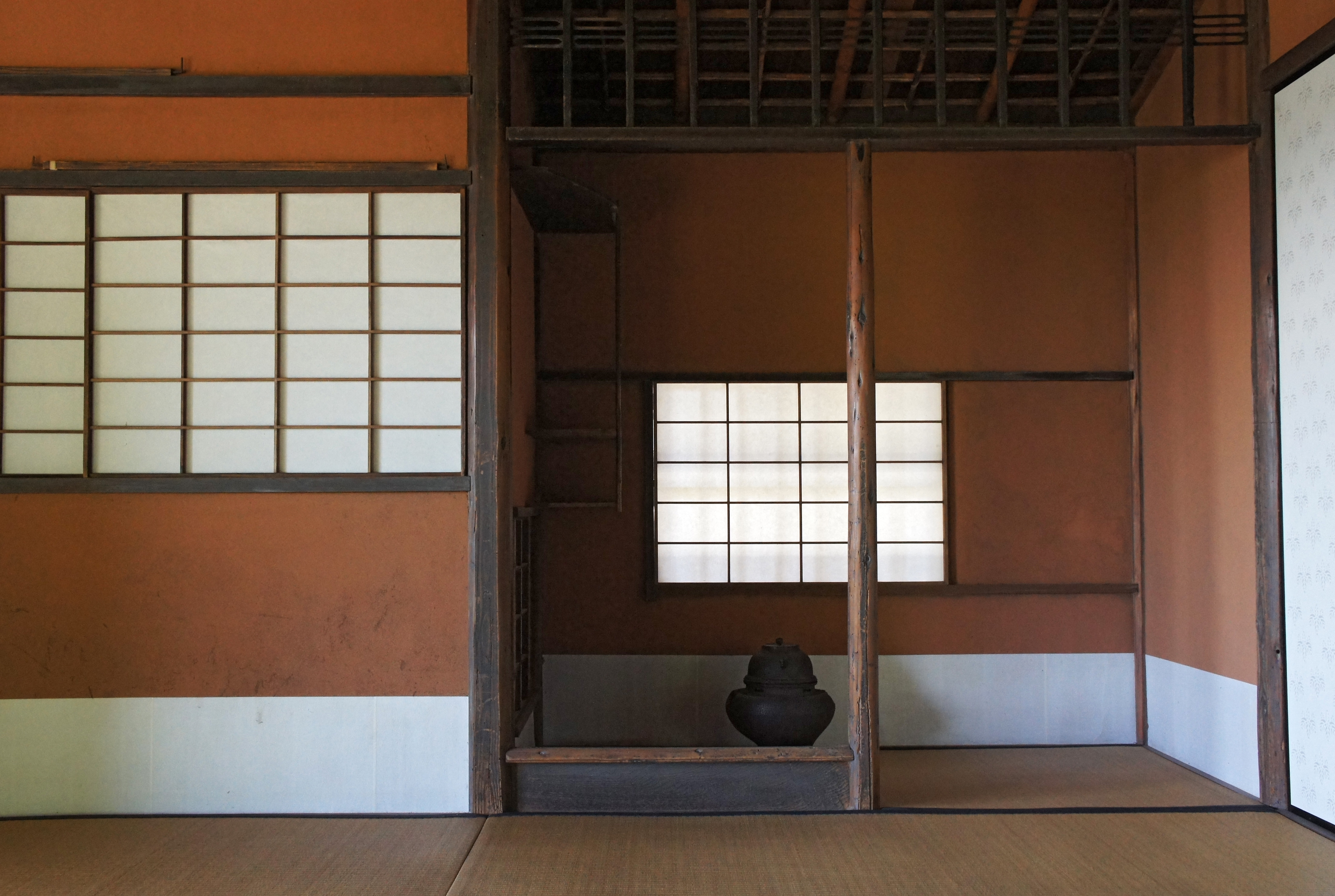
Isome-shi

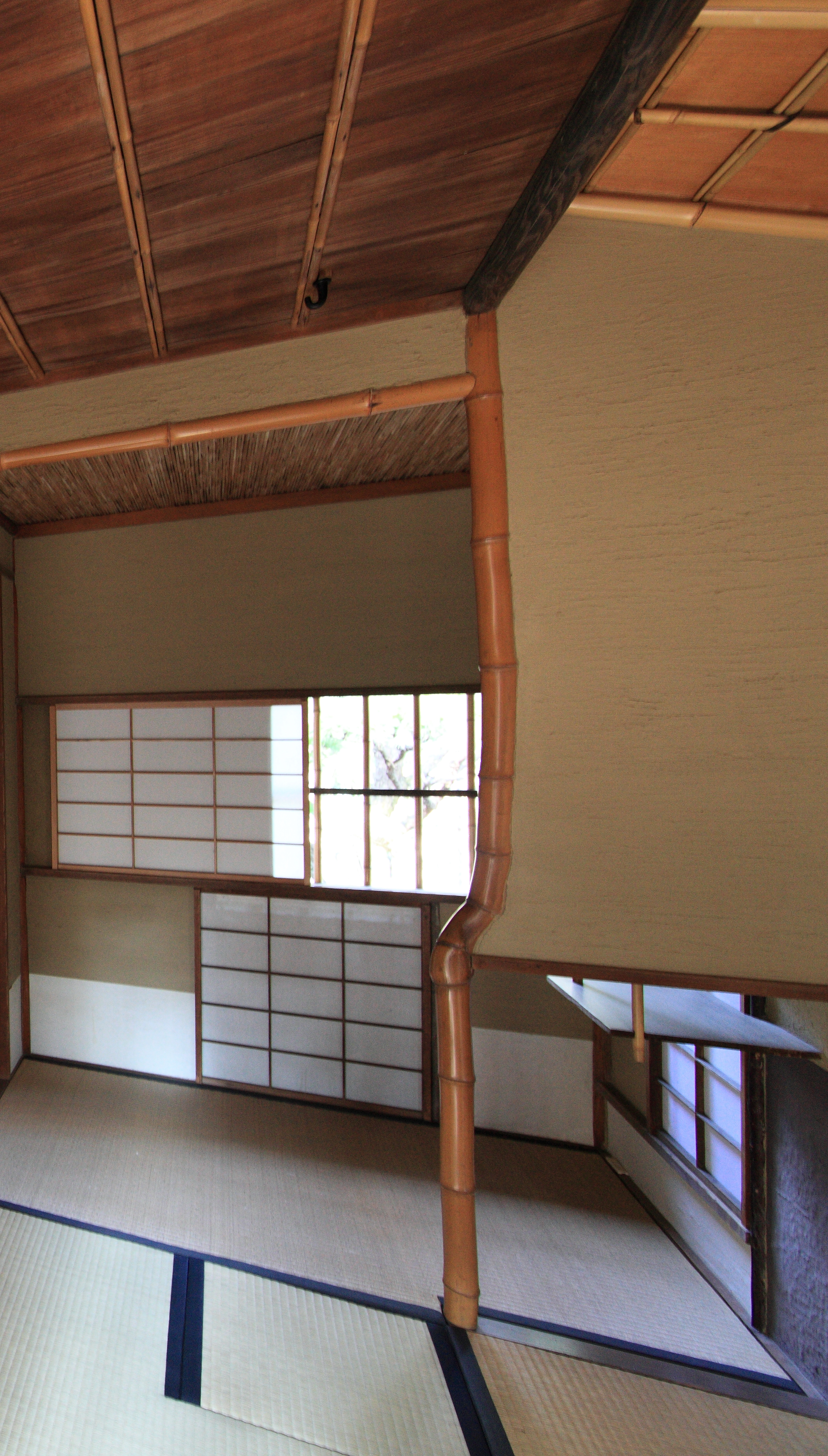
Kaisuian: stacked shikishi windows

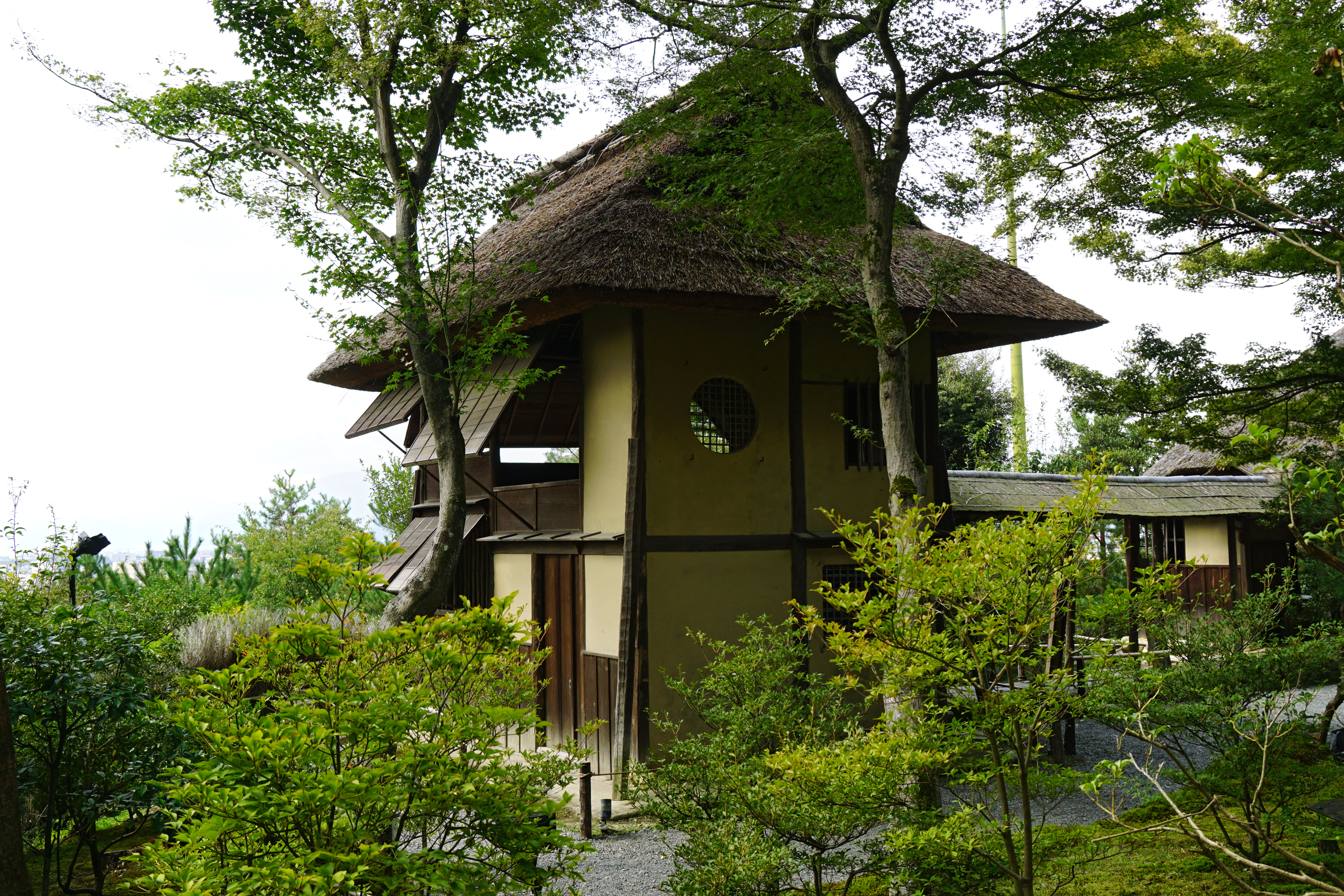
Shigure-tei is a unique two storied chashitsu, at Kōdai-ji in Kyoto.

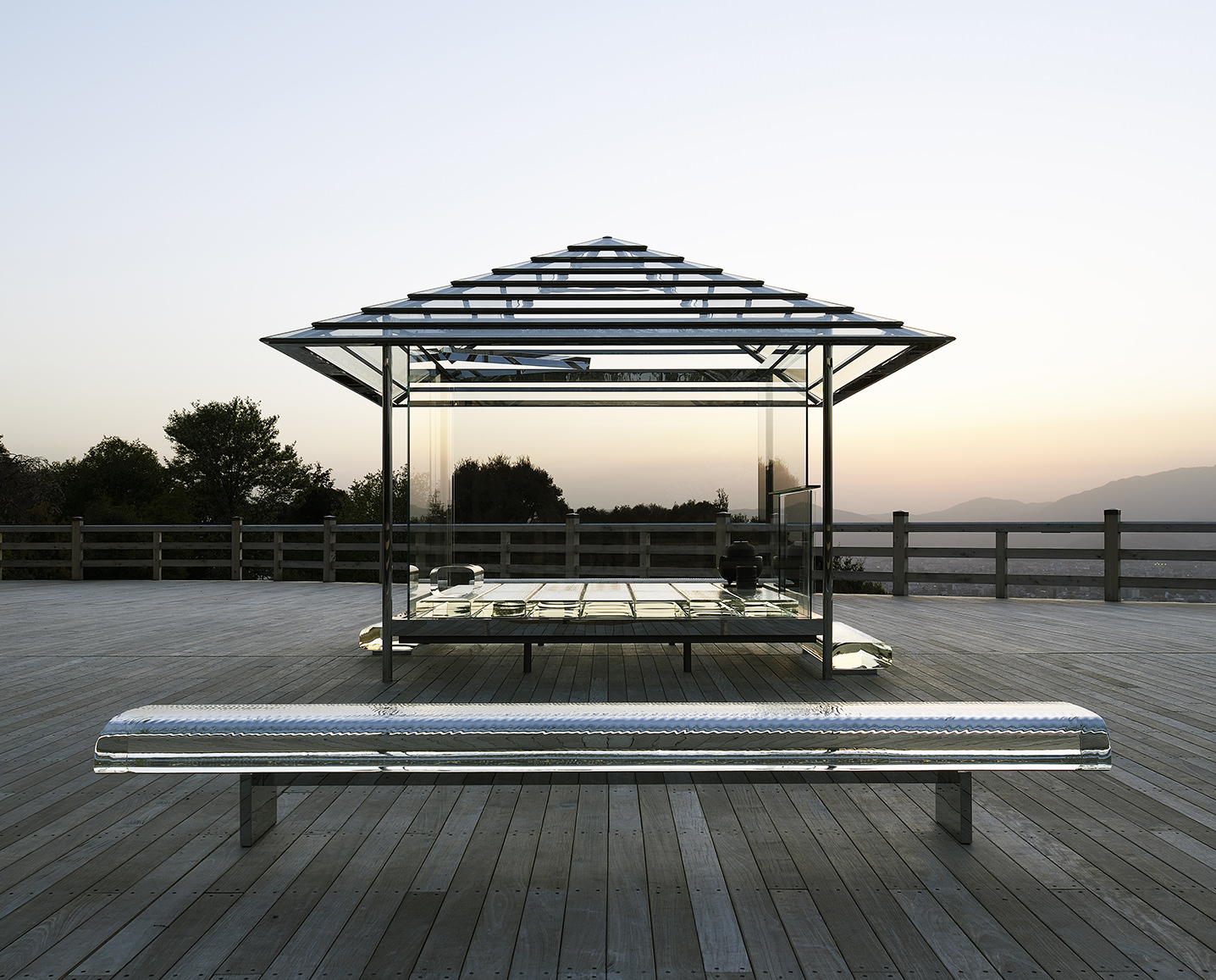
Glass Tea House - KOU-AN

== See also ==
- Ochaya – a geisha entertainment "tea house"
- List of teahouses
- Tea culture
- Teahouse
