= Nezame Monogatari Emaki =

- 寝覚物語絵巻 (Japanese)
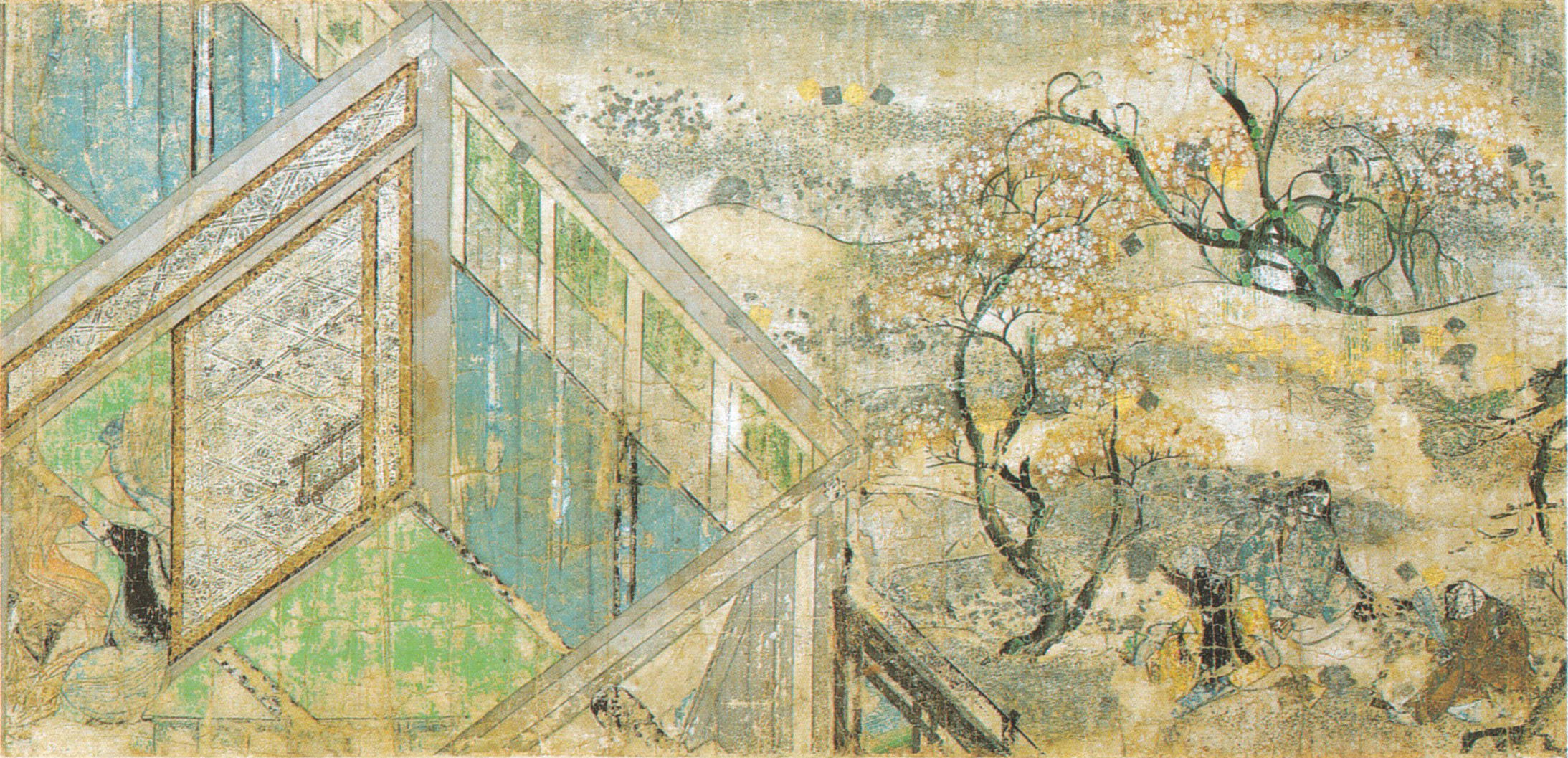
- First scene of the scroll
- Artist: Unknown
- Completion date: End of Heian period
- Medium: Emakimono; Paint and ink on paper handscroll
- Movement: Yamato-e
- Subject: Yoru no Nezame
- Designation: National Treasure
- Location: Museum of Japanese Art; (Yamato Bunkakan)

The Nezame Monogatari Emaki (寝覚物語絵巻) is an emakimono or emaki (painted narrative handscroll) from the Heian period of Japanese history (794–1185). It is an illuminated manuscript of Yoru no Nezame (夜の寝覚, Wakefulness at Midnight), which recounts a romance at the Imperial Court in Kyoto. The work is one of the oldest of the emakimono preserved today, as well as one of the few extant examples of the onna-e ("women's pictures") style of painting in the Heian period. It is also among the National Treasures of Japan, which enshrines the most inestimable cultural property of the nation.

== Background ==
Originating in Japan in the sixth or seventh century through trade with the Chinese Empire, emakimono art spread widely among the aristocracy in the Heian period. An emakimono consists of one or more long scrolls of paper narrating a story through Yamato-e texts and paintings. The reader discovers the story by progressively unrolling the scroll with one hand while rewinding it with the other hand, from right to left (according to the then horizontal writing direction of Japanese script), so that only a portion of text or image of about 60 cm (24 in) is visible. The narrative assumes a series of scenes, the rhythm, composition and transitions of which are entirely the artist's sensitivity and technique. The themes of the stories were very varied: illustrations of novels, historical chronicles, religious texts, biographies of famous people, humorous or fantastic anecdotes, etc.

During the Heian period, the illustrations of novels known as monogatari-e became very fashionable at court, contributing to the professionalisation and improvement of the art of emaki which reached its maturity around the second half of the 12th century.

== Description ==
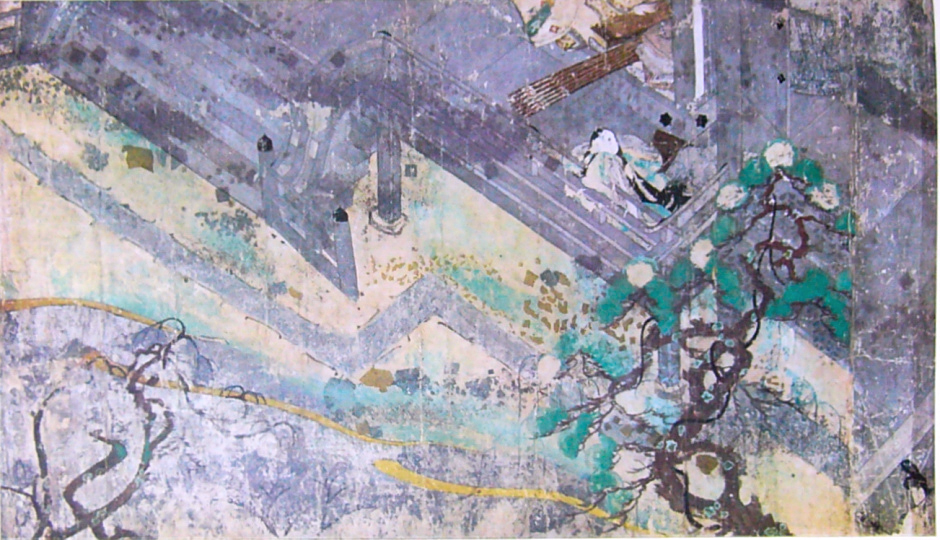
Second scene of the scroll

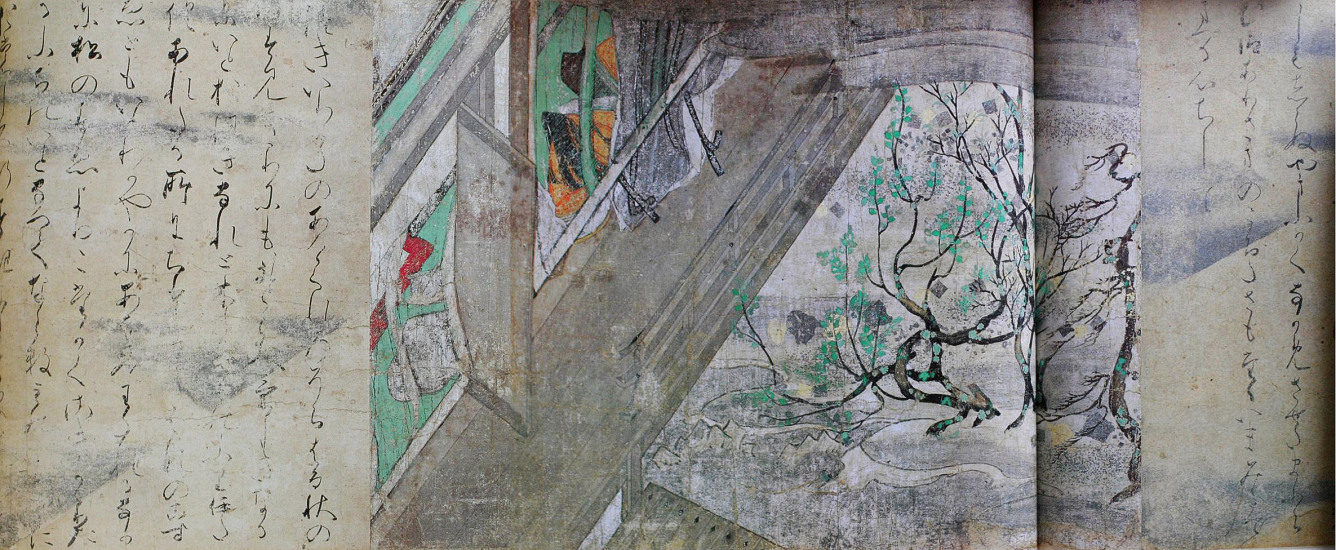
Third scene of the scroll

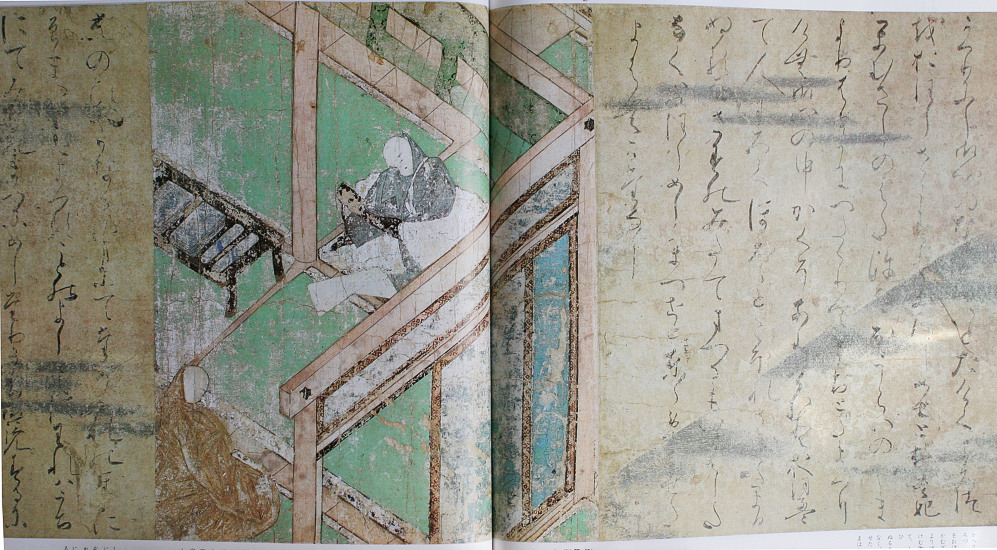
Fourth scene of the scroll

The emakimono illustrates the Yoru no Nezame, a prose novel recounting the vicissitudes of life at the court of a young courtesan named Nakanokimi or Nezame, and constantly immersing the reader in Nezame's thoughts and feelings. The story centers on the romance between Nezame and a court counsellor (a Chūnagon), by whom she becomes pregnant, but there are many obstacles that make this love impossible, including the fact that the counsellor is promised to Nezame's older sister, Ōigimi. Nezame is therefore forced to marry another man older than herself, for whom she develops a certain affection in the absence of love.

Only one fairly damaged scroll remains of the emakimono. It includes five sections of prose text and four illustrations, for a total length of 528 cm (208 in) and a height of 25.8 cm (10.2 in). The scroll probably covers the last part of the novel. The author and the sponsor are unknown.

The first scene is dominated by Japanese cherry trees against a rich background sprinkled with dust of gold, silver and mica. Three young girls, one playing the flute and two holding a fan, sit under the trees. The lower left part reveals the interior of a rich house. The significance of the scene is uncertain, but it may be Nezame's visit to his beautiful daughter. The second scene shows a courtesan resting on a veranda under a Wisteria plant. Two people are playing music at the top of the stage, while Masako, Nezame's son, appears in the lower right corner. This is undoubtedly the visit of Masako to Sadaijin-no-nyōgo, wife of the Emperor. The third scene is that of Masako's visit to a courtesan to whom he wishes to declare his love. A reflection of the moon appears fleetingly in the garden stream, while the figures are visible through the openings of the veranda on the left. The fourth scene shows the emperor speaking with a priest about Nezame's letter; unlike the other scenes, the atmosphere here is religious and solemn.

== Style and composition ==
The paintings in the emakimono fit within the onna-e genre of the Yamato-e style fashionable from the 12th century to the end of the Heian period. Onna-e paintings are generally very stylized, elegant and refined, with rich, opaque colour used to represent the peaceful, romantic and often nostalgic atmosphere of the lives of the ladies at the Imperial Court.

The pictorial style is close to that of the Genji Monogatari Emaki (c. 1120-1140), the most famous work of the onna-e genre. In particular, both paintings are effectuated according to the tsukuri-e (constructed painting) method. A first sketch of the scene is made in India ink, then the colour is applied in a precise order, from the large areas in the background to the final details, following the instructions of the master sometimes annotated directly on the paper. Finally, the outlines are drawn again or enhanced in ink to accentuate the depth.

The so-called fukinuki yatai technique, involving the removal of building roofs, was used to depict both the interior of a building and its exterior, be it a garden or a veranda, in the same scene. The faces are realised according to the hikime kagibana technique typical of onna-e, that is to say that the faces are represented in abstract ways, with three lines (for the eyes and the nose) on a white background.

The Nezame Monogatari Emaki appears to be more decorative than the Genji Monogatari Emaki, incorporating, e.g., silver and gold powder in the painting, and softer colours. Angles are also more abrupt in composition. The representation of nature is remarkable in these paintings: very elaborate, it subtly emphasises the feelings of the characters as well as a certain melancholy, ultimately taking precedence over the characters. As is often the case in Japanese painting, the season is clearly portrayed; here, spring is represented by cherry blossoms and wisteria.

== Provenance ==
The Nezame Monogatari Emaki is one of the few remaining examples of monogatari-e of the Heian period, and, together with the Genji Monogatari Emaki, one of the oldest examples of onna-e of the Imperial Court. It testifies to the refinement achieved by narrative court painting at the end of the Heian period, which heralds the golden age of the emakimono. Since 22 November 1962, it has been classified as one of the National Treasures of Japan. The work is stored at the Museum of Japanese Art (Yamato Bunkakan) in Nara.

The original text of Yoru no Nezame is lost nowadays, and only parts of it are known from copies; as the texts of the scroll were probably directly inspired by the original novel, the scroll presents a certain literary importance for the study and the comprehension of the original text.

A copy from the Edo period made by Kanō Osanobu (Kanō school) is held by the Tokyo National Museum.

== See also ==
- List of National Treasures of Japan (paintings)
- Murasaki Shikibu Diary Emaki
- National Treasure (Japan)
