= Murasaki Shikibu Nikki Emaki =

Mid-13th century emaki

- 紫式部日記絵巻 (Japanese)
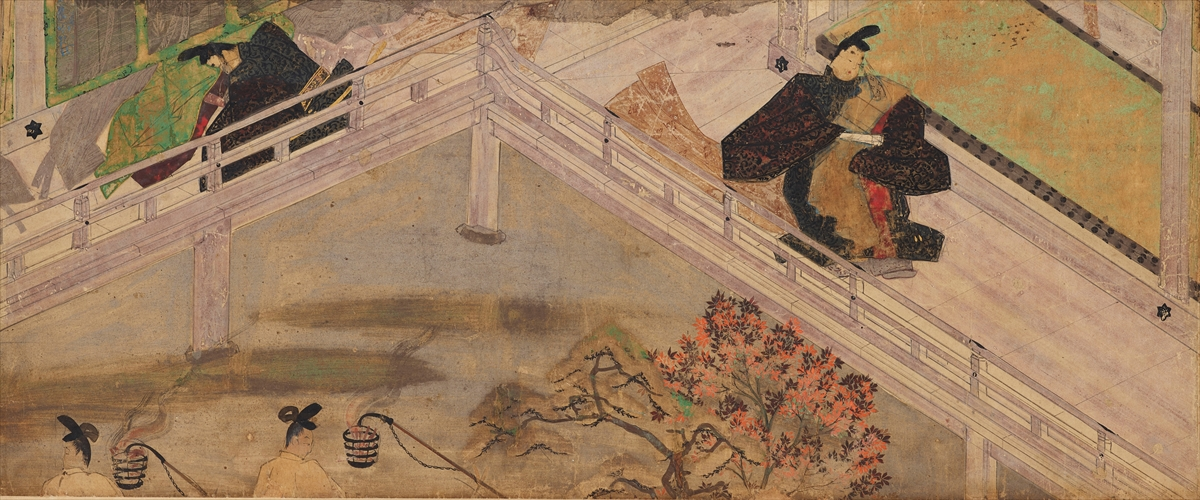
- First painting of the Fujita scroll showing two courtiers on the balcony of a building and men lighting torches in the garden outside the house
- Artist: Unknown
- Completion date: 13th century
- Medium: Emakimono; Paint and ink on paper handscroll
- Movement: Yamato-e
- Subject: Murasaki Shikibu
- Designation: National Treasure
- Location: Fujita Art Museum; Gotoh Museum; Tokyo National Museum; Three private collections

The Murasaki Shikibu Nikki Emaki (紫式部日記絵巻) is a mid-13th century emaki (Japanese picture scroll) inspired by the private diary (nikki) of Murasaki Shikibu, lady-in-waiting at the 10th–11th century Heian court and author of The Tale of Genji. This emaki belongs to the classical style of Japanese painting known as yamato-e, and revives the iconography of the Heian period.

Today there remain four paper scrolls of the emaki in varying condition, and stored in different collections: Hachisuka, Matsudaira, Hinohara scrolls (Tokyo), and Fujita scroll (Fujita Art Museum, Osaka). Of the extant scrolls, the first relates the celebrations on occasion of the birth of prince Atsunari (Atsuhira, later Emperor Go-Ichijō) in 1008 and the last those of the birth of Prince Atsunaga (later Emperor Go-Suzaku) in 1009. This difference in time indicates that the original emaki most likely consisted of more scrolls than exist today.

== Description ==
The Diary of Lady Murasaki (紫式部日記, Murasaki Shikibu Nikki) records the daily life of the Heian era lady-in-waiting and writer, Lady Murasaki Shikibu, author of The Tale of Genji. Most likely written between 1008 and 1010, the largest portion consists of descriptive passages of the birth of Empress Shōshi's (Akiko) children (future Emperors Go-Ichijō and Go-Suzaku) and related festivities, with smaller vignettes describing life at the Imperial court and relations between other ladies-in-waiting and court writers such as Izumi Shikibu, Akazome Emon and Sei Shōnagon. It also gives a lively account of the regency of the powerful Fujiwara no Michinaga. Like the romantic novel Genji, the diary deals with emotions and human relationships, particularly with Murasaki Shikibu's constraints at the court of Akiko, and her loneliness and feelings of futility after her husband's death (in 1001). The author is critical of her contemporaries, the men for their discourteous ways (including Fujiwara no Michinaga) and the women for their inexperience and lack of education and will. The diary is considered a masterpiece of Nikki Bungaku.

Emaki, which are long paper scrolls telling a story through texts and paintings, came to Japan through exchange with the Chinese Empire around the 6th century and spread widely among the Heian aristocracy. The subsequent Kamakura period was marked by internal strife and civil wars that fostered the rise of the warrior class. If the warriors of the bakufu preferred "quick-moving narrative scrolls" such as war tales or legends, the production of emaki at the Heian court subsisted. Pictures illustrating The Tale of Genji continued to be popular into the early Kamakura period and revived interest in the author, Murasaki Shikibu. Towards the end of the 13th century, a renewed interest in the refined culture of the Heian period led some artists to return to painting styles of the Imperial Court; many emaki were produced during this period.

The Murasaki Shikibu Nikki Emaki belongs to this golden age of the emaki and according to Penelope Mason "may be regarded as one of the finest extant examples of prose-poetry narrative illustration from the Kamakura period". It was created about 200 years after the diary was written, in the mid-13th century. (Note: Suzuki Keizō, a scholar of the history of costume, dated it to around 1250.) It transcribes the solitude and the observations of palace life from the diary but adds to the text a certain nostalgia for the glorious past of the Heian court which is typical for the 13th century, giving an overall feeling of "lost golden age", according to Mason, even during happy events such as parties. The explanatory notes (or captions), i.e. the non-painting part, show little textual deviations from the diary.

An emaki of Murasaki Shikibu's diary is mentioned in the Meigetsuki ("Record of the clean moon"), the diary of the poet and scholar Fujiwara no Teika. According to this document, in 1233 several aristocrats close to cloistered Emperor Go-Horikawa planned to create a new emaki of The Tale of Genji (after the 12th century Genji Monogatari Emaki, the best known of these works), accompanied by another of Murasaki's diary. However, there is no conclusive evidence that the extant scrolls correspond to those mentioned by Fujiwara no Teika, even though the consistency of manufacturing dates suggests that this is the case. The paintings of the emaki have been attributed to the painter Fujiwara Nobuzane and the captions to the excellent calligrapher Gokyōgoku (後京極良経; 1169–1206), despite definitive evidence.

== Style and composition ==
Two elements are found in the illustrations of the emaki: people indoors engaging in activities typical of the aristocracy of the period, such as writing letters, playing instruments, exchanging poems or talking to each other; and the gardens outside their buildings. For this reason, Mason calls the people in the emaki "house bound". The leftward direction of scroll reading is reflected in the composition of paintings and pictures which may build to a climax from right to left; or a main event presented on the right may be followed by its after-effects to the left. Stylistically the emaki follows the principles of the onna-e genre of yamato-e and is in this respect similar to the Tale of Genji Scrolls (1120–1140) but differs from them in many other aspects. Typical for onna-e, the paintings depict life at the palace with a sense of nostalgia, timeless and very retained, but purely decorative elements such as landscapes and contemplative scenes are added. Illustrations are relatively short (Note: In the case of the Genji Monogatari Emaki, 43 cm (17 in) on average.) compared to emaki of war or folktales, (Note: Where a single scene could be more than 2 m (6 ft 7 in) long) which according to Mason, "heightens the symbolic quality of non-figural motifs".

The painting technique of tsukuri-e ("built painting"), used mainly in emaki of the court in the 12th century, is also used here. It is done in three stages: a first sketch of the scene is made with Indian ink (probably by a master of the workshop), then the color is applied on the entire surface of the paper in a specific order, from large areas in the background to fine details. Finally, the contours are enhanced or revived in ink to emphasize the depth. However, a visible change in style may again be noted, because the pigments are here less opaque than usual, and the more subtle shades are highlighted by fine outlines in ink; and in addition, the decorative aspect emerges strongly through extensive use of gold dust, and sometimes of silver. According to Mason, the technique seems to be less careful than in the past, as can be seen in elements of the architectural interior (such as sliding doors and screens) which lack detail or in the silver powder which is used much less often in general compared to gold.

The cultural changes after the Heian period resulted in a more realistic depiction of figures including movements and gestures. Abandoning the Heian period hikime kagibana ("slit eyes, hooked nose") style, (Note: A technique of representing the faces with four lines on a white background, similar to Noh masks to mark the extreme reclusiveness of the aristocrats) figures were painted individual features and facial expressions that conveyed emotions and moods. More generally, M. Murase notes that the expression of feelings subtly changed compared to the scrolls of the 12th century; here the rooms (or the inner space, because it depends on the fusuma) in the palace are larger and less intimate or private, and nobles come and go naturally and determined. Unlike earlier scrolls such as the Genji Emaki, in which architecture and landscape were used as metaphors for people's emotions, interpersonal or societal pressures, in these scrolls the people's feelings are painted directly on the faces or shown through gestures, in addition to being expressed by the placement of characters within the scene. Architectural elements such as pillars, beams or platforms continued to be used to convey moods. Landscapes stand on their own as they are detached from the characters' emotions and gain a new function as a place to escape from the constraints of court life.

Like most emaki, the composition is based on the fukinuki yatai ("blown-off roof") technique, which consists of a perspective of looking down from above into the inner spaces resulting in a plunging view. Furthermore, diagonals are used to mark depth. Compared to earlier scrolls, in these scrolls, the interior spaces are depicted from a more normal perspective such as through rolled up bamboo blinds (misu) (Note: a thinly woven bamboo curtain hung before great people and women's apartments)) or spaces in the walls where sliding panels (fusuma) had been removed. The pace that is intentionally slow in tsukuri-e, here seems slightly faster with illustrations depicting a single occurrence in time and temporally related events positioned close to each other in the emaki.

This new decorative approach to paintings of the court (onna-e) inspired by the themes of literature is evident in several other works of the Kamakura period, such as uta monogatari (e.g. The Tales of Ise Emaki), tsukuri monogatari (e.g. Sumiyoshi Monogatari Emaki) and romances (e.g. Lord Takafusa's Love Songs (隆房卿艶詞絵巻, Takafusa Kyō tsuya kotoba emaki)).

== Historiography ==
The illustrations provide insight into life and festivities at the Heian Palace, which sometimes consisted of something as simple as games on the lake, although those might have been perceived differently at the time of manufacture. Like other picture scrolls on court life such as the Genji Monogatari Emaki or the Pillow Book Emaki (Makura no Sōshi Emaki) they provide valuable information on the architectural shinden-zukuri style (particularly on interiors) which is characterized by a mixture of Tang and traditional Japanese influences.

== Extant scrolls ==
It is thought that the emaki originally consisted of 10–12 scrolls. The ancestral heritage of the emaki before the Edo period (1603–1867) is not known, and an investigation conducted during the Meiji period (1868–1911) found that only four scrolls had survived, each 21.0 cm (8.3 in) high and about 4.5–5.4 m (15–18 ft) long. The owners and state of preservation of all four scrolls has since changed. The extant parts correspond to about 15 percent of the original diary and are not in sequence. They consist of 24 scenes of varying widths distributed among three scrolls, six single sheets and two hanging scrolls in six different locations: Fujita Art Museum, Gotoh Museum, Tokyo National Museum and three private collections. Each scroll begins with a text section and generally alternates scene descriptions with illustrations, ending with a painting. In two instances a long text section is split in two parts (Note: 3rd text of Hachisuka and 4th text of Hinohara scroll.) and the Hachisuka scroll has an accumulation of three illustrations (Note: Paintings 3, 4 and 5.) unseparated by text, and an accumulation of two unseparated independent text sections. (Note: Texts 6 and 7.)

=== Hachisuka scroll ===
Chronologically the oldest scenes of the emaki, combined with some of the later anecdotes in the diary, are contained in the Hachisuka scroll. Named after its former owner, the Hachisuka clan, rulers of the Tokushima Domain in Awa Province, this scroll is privately owned. It consists of eight illustrations and seven text sections on 16 paper sheets. The long third text section is split in two parts and followed by three illustrations. The seventh text section immediately follows the sixth without a painting between the two. The full scroll is 537.5 cm (211.6 in) long and has been designated as Important Cultural Property. Scenes 1–5 correspond to a continuous part of the diary and are the oldest diary entries represented by any of the four extant emaki scrolls. Scenes 6 and 7 correspond to later diary entries and appear in the diary after several of the scenes described in the other three extant scrolls.

==== Third day of birth celebration of Atsuhira-shinnō ====
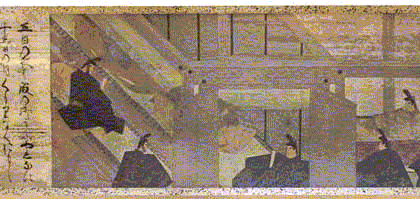
Nobles offering congratulations

The Hachisuka scroll starts with a description of a banquet given by the queen's majordomo and managed by the governor of Ōmi Province on Kankō 5, 9th month, 13th day (14 October 1008), the third night of the birth of Atsuhira-shinnō, the later Emperor Go-Ichijō. On that occasion, the mother, Empress Shōshi received presents such as baby clothes and furniture. The illustration associated with this scene shows court nobles on the balconies outside of the principal building in which the queen is located.

==== Fifth day of birth celebration of Atsuhira-shinnō ====
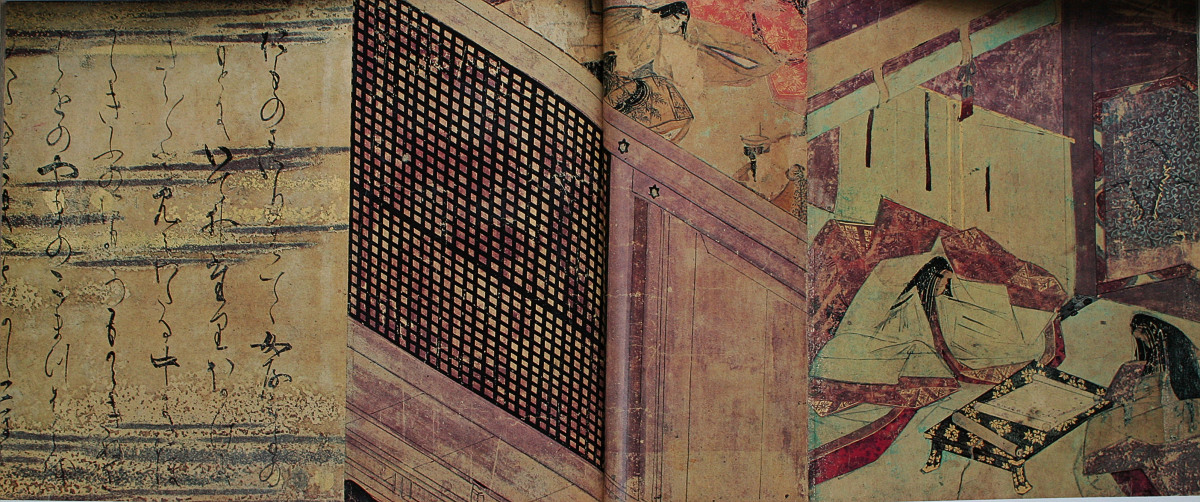
Fourth painting (right), fifth painting (middle) and fourth text section (left)

The second to fifth scenes of the Hachisuka scroll are set in the evening of Kankō 5, 9th month, 15th day (16 October 1008). On that day, the prime minister and baby's grandfather, Fujiwara no Michinaga, celebrates the birth. In the second text scene of the emaki, Murasaki Shikibu describes how everybody including servants, minor officials and high nobility was joyful and happy. Tables with mochi were placed in the garden, the full moon shone beautifully and torches made the scene as bright as in daylight. There is one illustration following this scene.

The third text is split in two parts, followed by three illustrations. The text contains a detailed description of how the dinner was served to the queen including the names of the maids of honour and their father's names. The ladies who had not been selected to attend "wept bitterly". Other people involved in the ceremony included uneme (women selected for their beauty), mohitori (officials in charge of wells, soy sauce and ice-houses), migusiage (attendants whose hair was done up with hairpins), tonomori (King's housekeepers, kanmori no nyokwan (cleaners) and door keepers. According to Murasaki Shikibu so many people were involved that it was hard to get through.

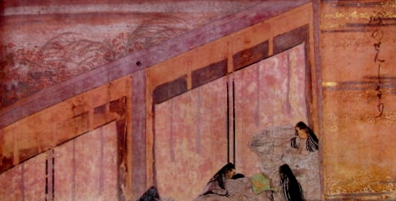
Court lady exits beneath blinds

The relatively short fourth scene describes that the maids of honour exit from the queen's room which had been partitioned off by misu entering the torch-lit garden. It also gives more details and an interpretation of the dress of one of those maids, Lady Oshikibu.

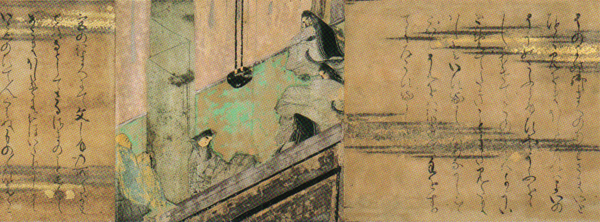
The seventh painting, located between the 5th (right) and 6th (left) text sections

The short fifth passage is a continuation of the previous events and relates an exchange of courtesies between court ladies and a monk who had kept night watch telling religious and other stories. Murasaki Shikibu tells him: You cannot see such a lovely thing every day, to which he replies: Indeed! indeed! clapping his hands in joy and neglecting his Buddha. The illustration shows an elderly priest near the left border of the painting pushing open a folding screen beyond which three court ladies are seated. Murasaki Shikibu is seated closest to the monk directly behind the screen.

==== Our lady of the chronicle ====
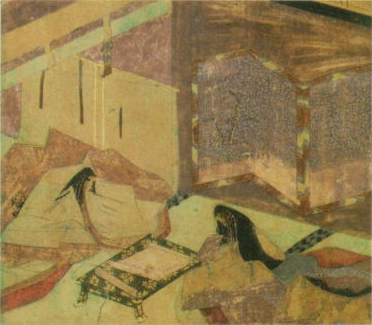
Murasaki Shikibu (right) reading to Empress Shōshi (left). A scroll of Bai Juyi's poetry anthology (白氏文集, Hakushi Monjū) is spread on a maki-e writing desk between them.

This anecdote, the sixth scene of the Hachisuka scroll, occurs at an unspecified date in 1009. It is part of a description of the lady Saemon no Naishi who, Murasaki Shikibu writes in the diary, hated her. Naishi spread the rumour that Murasaki Shikibu was proud of her Chinese learning (which in the Heian period was the domain of the male aristocracy) and gave her the name "Japanese Chronicle Lady". (Note: After the Chronicles of Japan written in Classical Chinese.) In the anecdote, Murasaki Shikibu explains she learned Chinese in childhood, that she was taught not to be proud of her learning, keeping it a secret during her life in fear of how others would judge her. The text in the emaki relates how Empress Shōshi requested that Murasaki Shikibu read to her in Chinese and teach her the poetical works of Bai Juyi (in particular the part known as shingafu (新楽府)) in secrecy. Nevertheless, the Emperor and Prime Minister found out about it and presented to the Empress a number of poetical works.

==== Gosechi dancers ====
This final scene in the Hachisuka scroll is about a scene from the Gosechi, an ancient dance performed by young beautiful girls in the 11th month to celebrate the harvest. The emaki text begins with a description of the appearance and clothing of two of the participating girls and ends with a scene in which the girls throw down their fans as the secretaries of the sixth rank approached them to take away their fans. Murasaki Shikibu considered the dancers graceful but unlike girls. This particular scene is set on Kankō 5, 11th month, 22nd day (22 December 1008).

==== Painting only scenes ====
The Hachisuka scroll contains paintings which are not associated with any text sections of the scroll. The fifth painting of the scroll corresponds to a scene described in the second text section of the Hinohara scroll, where Murasaki Shikibu is looking back to her first time at court. The painting shows Murasaki Shikibu inside a room with closed tsumado (hinged plank door) and shitomido (latticed shutters). Next to her is an old-fashioned interior light-fixture consisting of a wooden pole with an oil-filled dish and wick on top of it (tōdai). (Note: For a reproduction as relief see the lower image on this page.)

The final illustration of the Hachisuka scroll has no corresponding text section in the extant emaki fragments. However its content can be matched to a scene from the diary in which Murasaki Shikibu expresses her sorrows as a widow (Note: Her husband had died in 1001.) worrying about the future. She relates how she is gazing dreamily at the Moon when she is "hopelessly sad" and lonely. Playing the koto (a kind of horizontal harp) on a cool evening makes her even more miserable. This section of the diary also contains a short description of her room containing two bookcases, one with books that her husband had placed there and that no one has touched since, the other with "old poems and romances", likely referring to her own works. This scene is set on an unknown date in Kankō 6 (1009). The illustration present in the emaki (Note: For a reproduction as relief see the upper image on this page. For a recent reproduction of the painting see this image.) shows Murasaki Shikibu inside a tatami room playing the koto with a court lady walking outside her room on the balcony (engawa).

=== Fujita scroll ===
Formerly in possession of the Akimoto clan (秋元家), rulers of the Tatebayashi Domain in Kōzuke Province, the extant Fujita scroll alternates five sections of text and five paintings. Based on this ancestral heritage it is sometimes referred to as former Akimoto scroll. A sixth text only section has been preserved as a 19th-century copy from the original emaki. The extant scroll is 434.0 cm (170.9 in) long, in possession of the Fujita Art Museum, Osaka and was designated as National Treasure of Japan on 28 June 1956. It covers the time from the evening of the 5th day celebration of the birth of the first Imperial Prince, Atsuhira-shinnō, the later Emperor Go-Ichijō, and ends with the furnishing of Michinaga's residence for the visit of Emperor Ichijō.

==== Fifth day of birth celebration of Atsuhira-shinnō ====
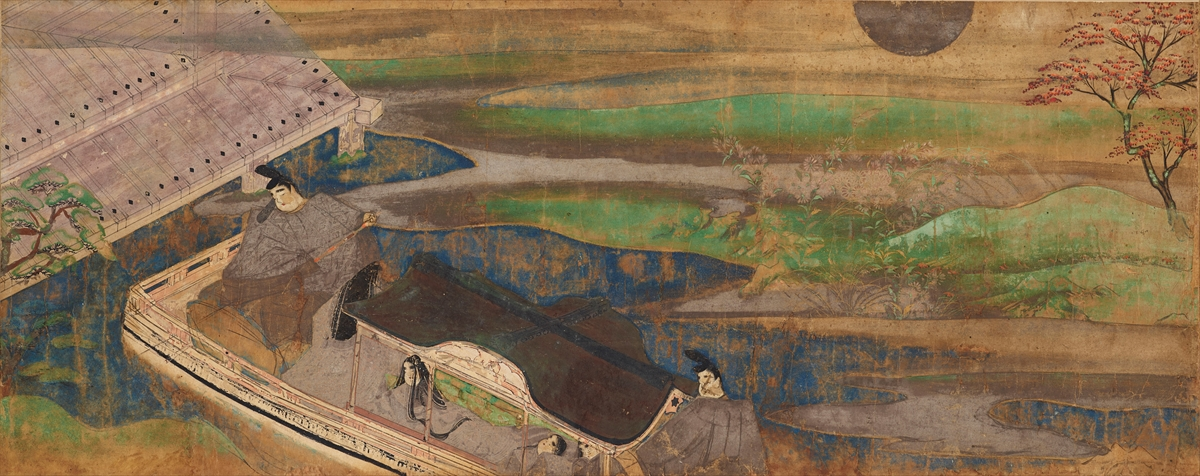
Second painting.

Set shortly after the fifth scene of the Hachisuka scroll, this scene relates events from the evening of Kankō 5, 9th month, 15th day (16 October 1008), the day Michinaga celebrated the birth of Atsuhira-shinnō. Some people were casting da (Note: A gambling game played with dice now not known.) others composed poems. Murasaki Shikibu then praises Fujiwara no Kintō's repartee and skills in the composition of poetry; however on this evening he did not participate in the exchange of poems. The queen gave gift of robes and baby dresses to the highest ranked ladies; lined kimono to those of 4th rank; and hakama to the lesser sixth ranked ladies.

==== A boating party ====
The second section is a direct continuation of the previous scene, recounting an outing of young courtiers, dressed in white, going boating on a moonlit night the following day (Kankō 5, 9th month, 16th day, or 17 October 1008 in the Gregorian calendar). The ladies left behind appeared jealous according to Murasaki Shikibu.

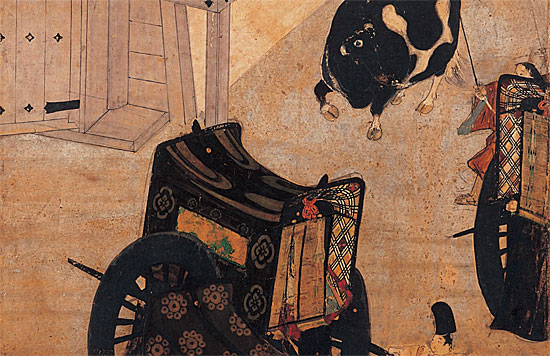
Ox-drawn carts of Emperor's ladies-in-waiting (illustration of the 3rd scene)

Continuing from the previous scene, confusion occurs among the people in the boats as palanquins of ladies-in-waiting of the Emperor's court appear near the shelter for conveyances. Michinaga welcomes them happily and distributes gifts among them.

==== Birth celebration organized by the Imperial Court ====
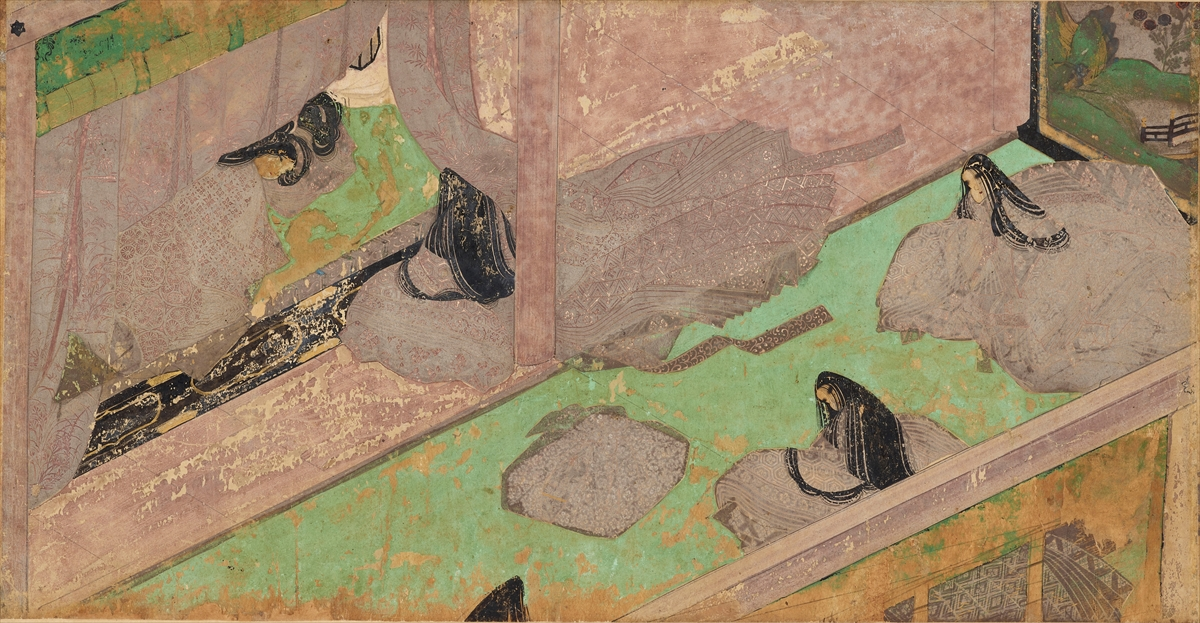
Murasaki Shikibu (center) catches a glimpse at the Empress (left) with undone hair beyond the misu.

The Emperor celebrated on Kankō 5, 9th month, 17th day (18 October 1008), the seventh day of the birth of Atsuhira-shinnō. Presents were exchanged between court nobles and the Emperor. During the evening ceremony, Murasaki Shikibu catches a glance of the queen, remarking that she appeared weary, having lost weight and gaining a pale complexion. Her "hair would be better tied up" writes Murasaki Shikibu; however she stops the description, realizing the impropriety of her depiction of the "mother of the nation".

==== Preparations for the Imperial visit ====
Set some time between Kankō 5, 10th month, 13th day and the morning of 16th day (13 to 16 November 1008), this scene begins with a description of planting chrysanthemums (Note: Chrysanthemum flowers are associated with the Imperial Family.) at Michinaga's mansion in preparation for the Emperor's visit. In the second part of the section, Murasaki Shikibu is musing about her melancholic life because of an "extraordinary sorrow", wishing to be more adaptable and mindless. Wondering whether she is too sinful, she yearns for a religious life. Seeing waterfowl playing heedlessly in a pond, she writes the following waka:

Waterfowl floating on the water—
They seem so gay,
But in truth
It is not gay to live anxiously seeking means of existence.

==== Day of the Imperial visit (Tanaka Shinbi copy) ====
A sixth text section of the Fujita scroll has been preserved in the form of a copy from the original manuscript made by Tanaka Shinbi (田中親美) (1875–1975), researcher and collector of Japanese fine arts who also assisted in the reproduction of old writings and ancient paintings including the Genji Monogatari Emaki. Starting in 1894 he worked on the reproduction of the Murasaki Shikibu Nikki Emaki. This text fragment does not include any illustration and is in possession of the Tanaka family.

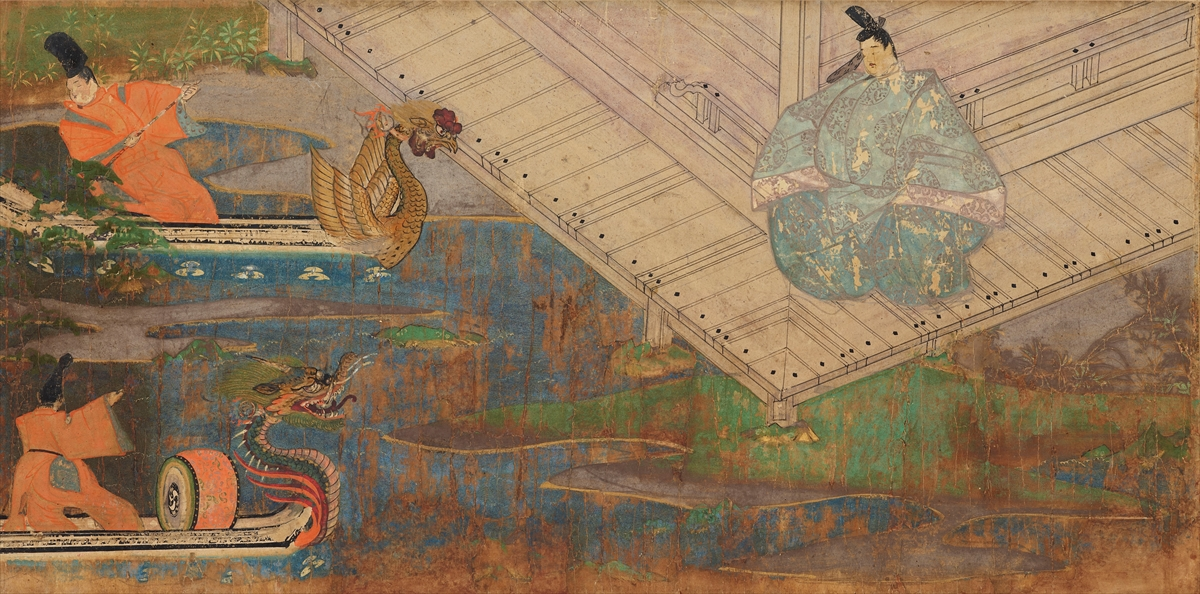
Final painting of the extant scroll corresponding to the sixth scene: Michinaga on the veranda of his boathouse watching courtiers enjoying themselves in the boats he has provided

The scene, which in the diary directly follows the fifth scene of the Fujita scroll, tells of an exchange of letters between Murasaki Shikibu and the Lady Koshosho. Writing her response at the time of a brisk shower in a hurry in order not to keep the messenger waiting as the "sky looked threatening", Murasaki Shikibu adds the following poem to her letter:

There are pauses between the showers of the outer world,
But there is no time when my sleeves, wet with tears, are dry.

After dark she receives the following reply from Lady Koshosho:

The dark sky dulls my dreamy mind,
The down-dripping rain lingers–
O my tears down falling, longing after thee!

Changing topic, Murasaki Shikibu mentions shortly that at the same day, Michinaga inspected two new boats, one with a dragon's head the other with a phoenix head at the prow, (Note: Both figures were said to have magical powers to prevent ships from sinking.) reminding her of animated living figures. The painting located in the emaki after the fifth text section, at the end of the extant Fujita scroll and originally before the sixth scene, illustrates this inspection of boats. Penelope Mason sees this diverse composition as a nostalgic representation of the 13th century Imperial Court past its golden age, as despite the "gaiety and splendor the scene is permeated with fleeting nature of joy and pleasure."

=== Matsudaira or former Morikawa scroll ===
In 1920 Morikawa Kanichirō (森川勘一郎, 1887–1980) from Nagoya discovered a 5-segment scroll of the Murasaki Shikibu Diary Emaki consisting of alternatingly five illustrations and five captions. Formerly in possession of the Matsudaira clan, rulers of the Saijō Domain in Iyo Province, this scroll is referred to as "Matsudaira clan edition" or after its finder as "Former Morikawa edition" (not to be confused with the Morikawa edition below which refers to the Morikawa family). Two years after discovery Morikawa sold the scroll to the Niigata businessman and master of the tea ceremony, Masuda Donō (益田鈍翁, 1847－1938, who had it cut into parts. One part (Morikawa edition), the fifth segment, is bequeathed to the Morikawa family and today in a private collection. A year later, in 1933, Donō detached the third segment and reformatted it as a hanging scroll (now in possession of the Agency for Cultural Affairs). The remaining three scenes (numbers 1, 2, 4) were framed in 1934, changed owner once more, eventually (via the Takanashi family) ending up in the collection of the Gotoh Museum. They are known collectively as "Gotoh edition". Today's Matsudaira scroll is spread over three locations and includes one National Treasure and two Important Cultural Properties. While this scroll has not survived in one piece, a 20th-century reproduction measures in at 453.1 cm (178.4 in) long. With the exception of the first scene of the Gotoh edition, the Matsudaira clan scroll depicts events on Kankō 5, 11th month, 1st day (1 December 1008), the day of the ika-no-iwai, (Note: Ika-no-iwai is a celebration (mainly celebrated by Heian aristocrats) 50 days after the birth in which the father or the maternal grandfather (or others) made the baby eat mochi.) the 50th day of birth celebration of Atsuhira-shinnō, the later Emperor Go-Ichijō.

==== Gotoh edition ====
The Gotoh edition corresponds to scenes 1, 2 and 4 of the Matsudaira clan scroll and had been partitioned off from the scroll in 1932 and 1933 by Masuda Donō. It consists of 3 paintings and 3 associated captions each framed individually (six items in total). This set has been designated as National Treasure on 28 June 1956, and is located at the Gotoh Museum.

===== Moonlit night =====
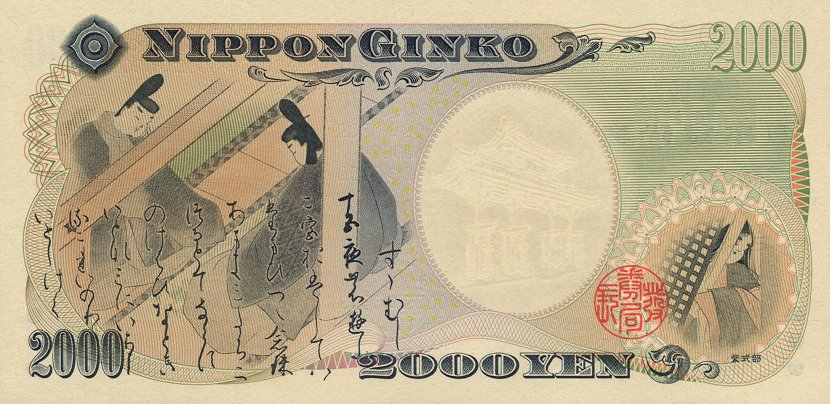
The image of Murasaki Shikibu (bottom right) on the 2000 yen bank note is taken from this scene.

The scene dated to Kankō 5, 10th month, 17th day (17 November 1008), shows two drunk courtiers trying to gain entrance to Murasaki Shikibu quarters after she had enjoyed the garden outside her apartment. In the illustration, Murasaki holds her window shut against the men. First to arrive at the scene is the palace steward Sangi Fujiwara no Sanenari (藤原実成) (on right) who opens the upper part of Murasaki's lattice door and inquires whether anybody is at home. According to Murasaki Shikibu his intention is to be mentioned to Akiko. Sanenari is joined by the consort's steward (associated with Akiko), Sangi Fujiwara no Tadanobu (藤原斉信) who also calls out: "Is anyone here?" Murasaki replies faintly, avoiding anything that could be regarded as flirting. Together the two courtiers are requesting her to open the lower part of the door. Such behaviour, somebody of higher rank trying to enter the house of somebody of lower rank, was in the Heian period considered disgraceful and only excused by the young age of the two courtiers.

In the top right corner, Murasaki's friend, the maid Saishō no Kimi, is visible. The large garden occupying the left half of the painting and the diagonally positioned building are considered to be a bold scene arrangement. According to Penelope Mason, this is "one of the saddest and most beautiful [scenes] in the scroll", contrasting the beauty of the moonlit garden and pond on the left with the constraints of court life. The latticed shitomi and the stewards separate Murasaki Shikibu from the outside world, keeping her a prisoner in the room.

Scene 1

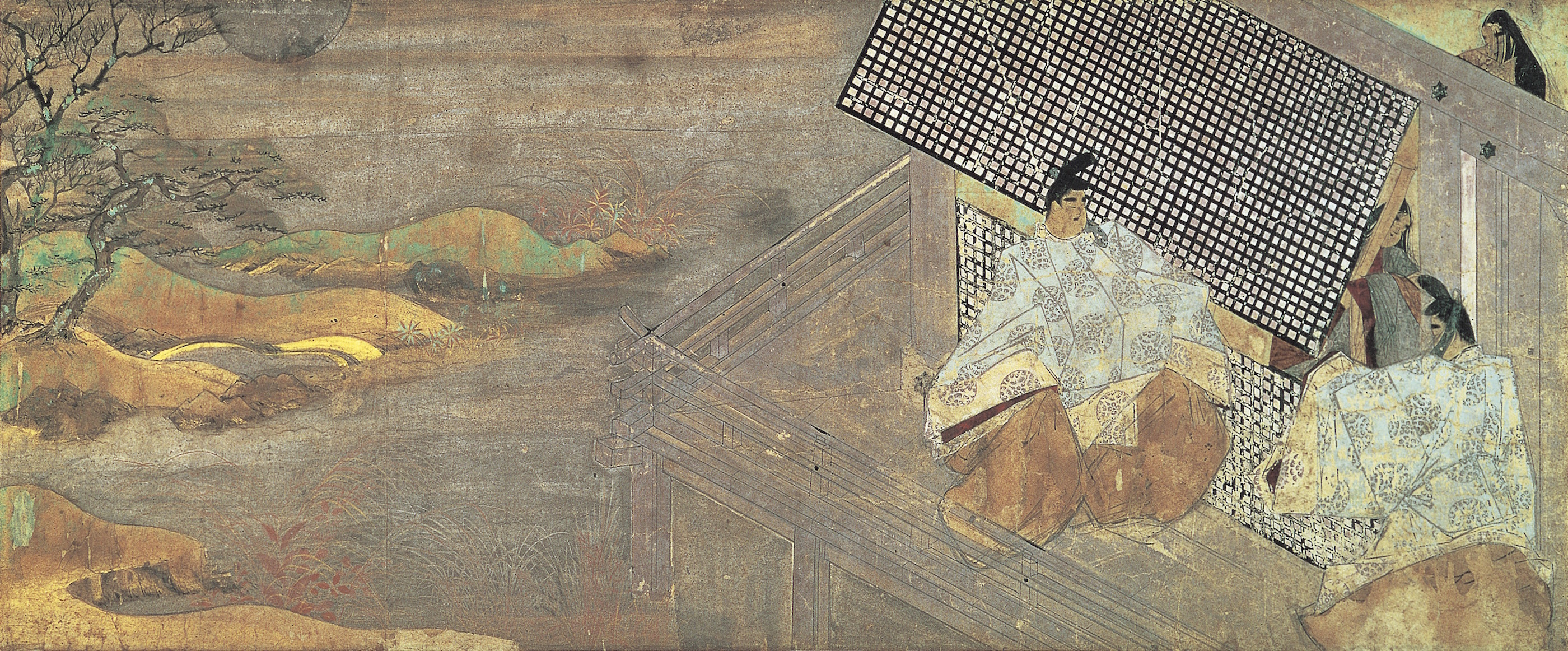
21.0 cm × 50.3 cm (8.3 in × 19.8 in)

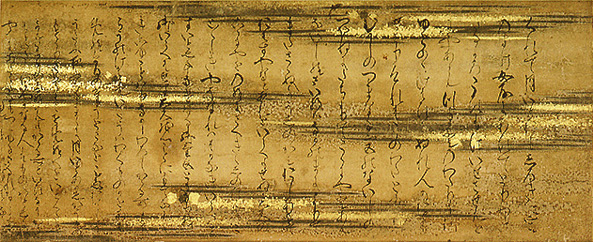
21.0 cm × 51.4 cm (8.3 in × 20.2 in)

Is anyone here?

===== 50 day celebration of the birth of Atsuhira-shinnō =====
As with all but the first scene of the Matsudaira scroll, this scene is set on the evening of Kankō 5, 11th month, 1st day (1 December 1008), the day of the Ika-no-iwai of the Imperial Prince Atsuhira-shinnō, the later Emperor Go-Ichijō. The painting shows a room inside a shinden partitioned off by kichō room dividers featuring the design of decaying trees. Empress Shōshi, with the baby in her arms, is partially visible at the top. Court ladies are serving various types of ritual food.

Scene 2

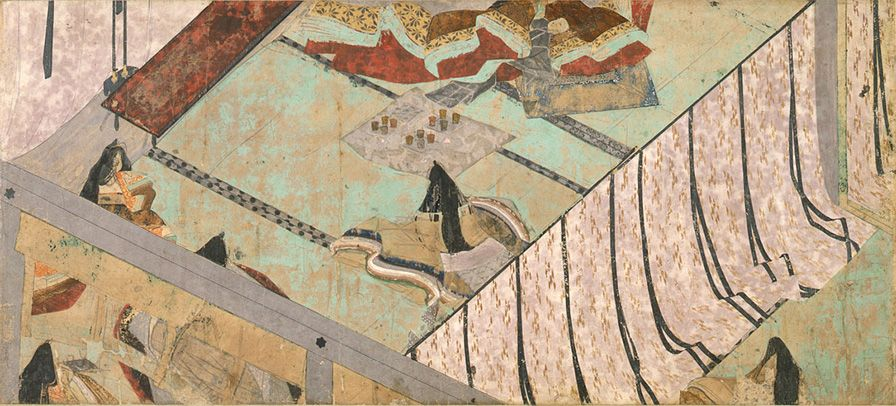
21.0 cm × 46.4 cm (8.3 in × 18.3 in)

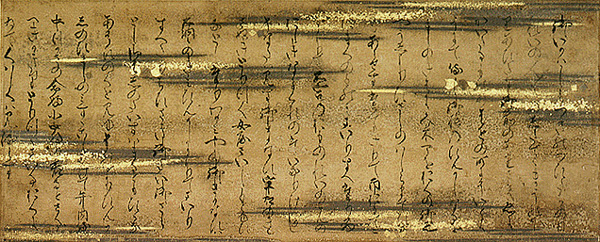
21.0 cm × 51.9 cm (8.3 in × 20.4 in)

The sight before her presence was like a picture of a poet's assembly.

The third scene held by the Gotoh museum was originally the fourth segment of the Matsudaira clan scroll. It is therefore preceded by the segment held by the Agency for Cultural Affairs and followed by the 5th segment of the Matsudaira clan scroll which is in possession of the Morikawa family. Like those segments, this scene is dated to the evening of the Ika-no-iwai celebration of Atsuhira-shinnō. It shows drunk and disordered court nobles amusing themselves with court ladies. This painting is particularly notable for its lifelike depiction of facial expressions and shapes of each figure in the scene.

Scene 3 (scene 4 of the Matsudaira clan scroll)

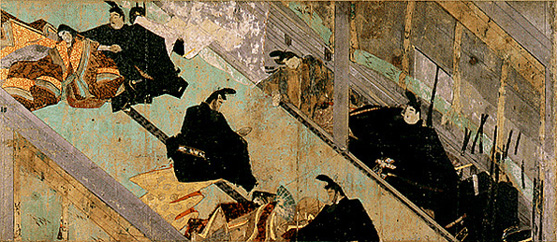
21.0 cm × 48.4 cm (8.3 in × 19.1 in)

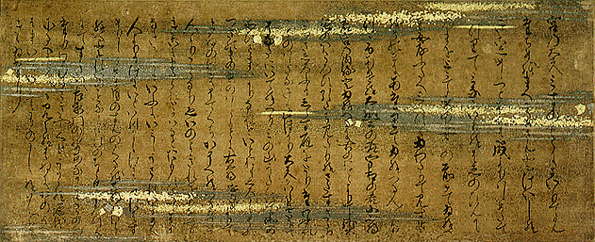
21.0 cm × 51.4 cm (8.3 in × 20.2 in)

Murasaki Shikibu wondering to herself on seeing the drunk courtiers: How can she be here in a place where there is no such graceful person as Prince Genji?

==== Former Ōkura family fragment ====
This item, consisting of one painting and associated caption/text, was originally the third scene of the Matsudaira clan scroll before being reshaped into a hanging scroll by Masuda Donō in 1933. At some point it was in possession of the Ōkura clan (大倉家), but it is now owned by the Agency for Cultural Affairs and in custody of the Tokyo National Museum. It was designated an Important Cultural Property on 31 March 1953. Like its preceding and successive scenes (scenes 2 and 3 from the Gotoh edition), the painting depicts the celebration for the 50th day of the birth of the Imperial Prince Atsuhira-shinnō, the later Emperor Go-Ichijō in the evening of Kankō 5, 11th month, 1st day (1 December 1008). The main characters are in full dress in a room decorated with kichō partitioners and the prince's grandfather, Fujiwara no Michinaga at the bottom is offering rice cake (mochi) to the prince in a form of ceremonial ritual. The female servant at the bottom right is presumably the author of the diary Murasaki Shikibu.

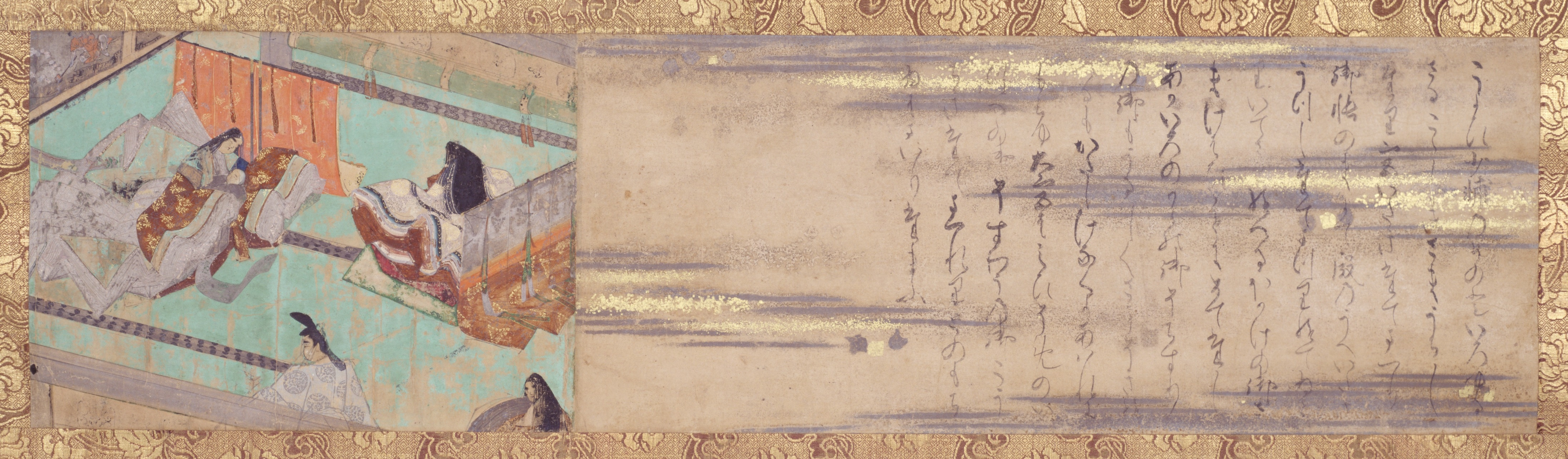
3rd segment of former Morikawa edition. 20.9 cm × 79.2 cm (8.2 in × 31.2 in)

==== Morikawa family fragment ====
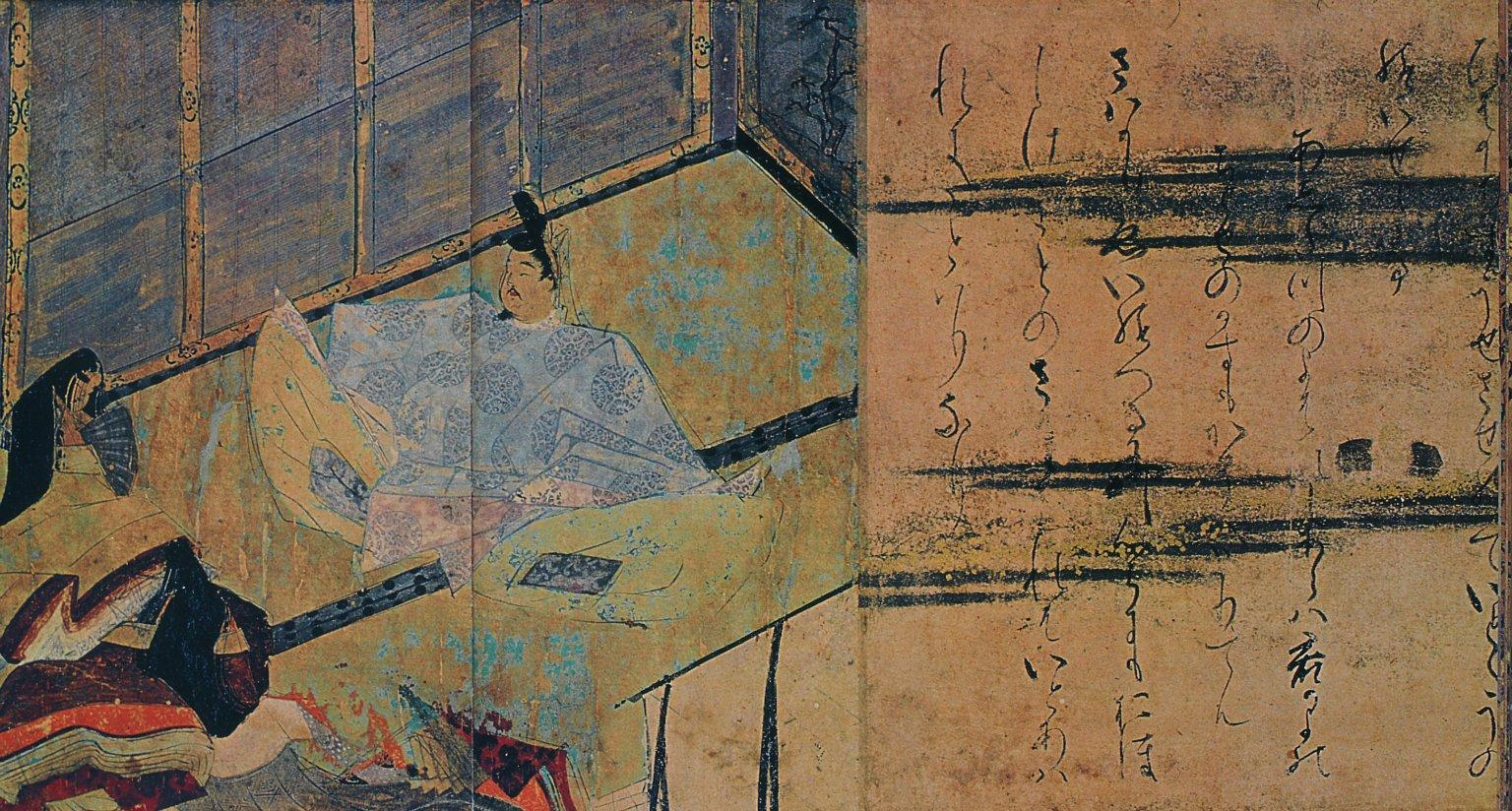
Each of you compose a poem. If you do, you shall be excused. (ca. 38 cm (15 in) wide, part of the fragment with 14 lines of calligraphy cut off at the right in this image)

The 5th segment of the five-segment Matsudaira clan scroll was separated in 1932 and mounted as hanging scroll. This fragment is 73.7 cm (29.0 in) wide. Named after their present owners, it is known as the Morikawa clan edition. It consists of a single scene with a very short illustration showing the inside of a traditional Japanese style room with fusuma sliding doors, tatami and a curtain. Like all but the first segment of this scroll, the scene is set in the evening of Kankō 5, 11th month, 1st day (1 December 1008) on occasion of the 50th day celebration of the birth of Atsuhira-shinnō, the later Emperor Go-Ichijō. Murasaki Shikibu and Saishō no Kimi had been hiding from the drunken carousal of that evening, but were discovered by Michinaga, Saishō no Chūjō and others. The painting is dominated by the massive figure of Fujiwara no Michinaga dressed in brocade jacket and trousers and placed in the centre of the room. Murasaki Shikibu and Saishō no Kimi are huddled near the border of the painting with heads bent down as a sign of submission and deference. On discovering the two court ladies in hiding, Michinaga demands a poem from each of them. Murasaki being frightened and helpless in this situation recites the following waka:

On the fiftieth day how should one number those that follow?
May the Prince's life span more than eight thousand years.

Despite being drunk, Michinaga answered quickly with another poem:

O would I might live the life of a crane—
Then might I reckon the years of the Prince
Up to one thousand!

which according to Murasaki's diary "came from his innermost desire". Based on the topic, this scene resembles the Azumaya edition of the Genji emaki where another court noble demands a response from a woman. This part of the scroll was designated Important Cultural Property on 19 July 1952.

=== Hinohara or former Hisamatsu scroll ===
Formerly in possession of the Hisamatsu-Matsudaira clan, a branch of the Matsudaira clan and rulers of the Iyo-Matsuyama Domain, this scroll is now privately owned by the Hinohara family (日野原家). Due to this ancestral heritage it is variously referred to as "former Hisamatsu scroll" or "Hinohara scroll". The scroll is 531.6 cm (209.3 in) long and consists of alternatingly six sections of text and six associated paintings on 13 sheets of paper. The fourth text part is relatively long and has been split in two. The scroll has been designated as an Important Cultural Property of Japan.

==== Day of the Bird festival ====
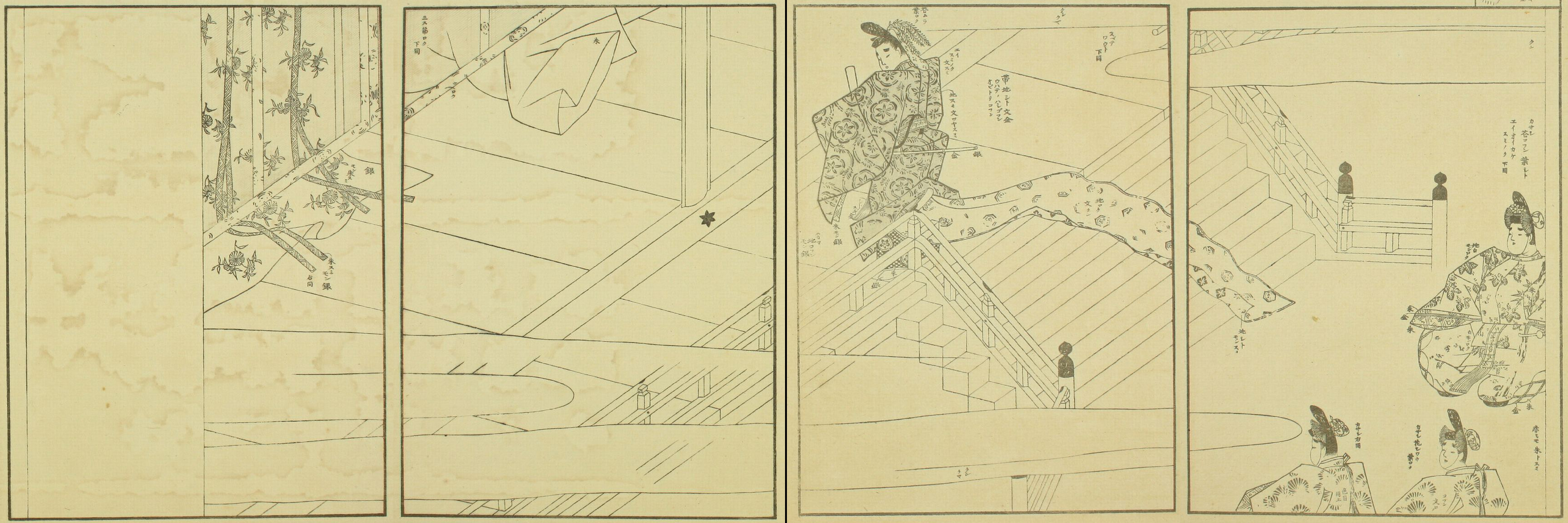
Ukiyo-e reproduction of 1st painting

Murasaki Shikibu tells of an anecdote at the festival of the Kamo Shrine held on Kankō 5, 11th month, 28th day (28 December 1008), the last Day of the Bird (酉の日, tori no hi). (Note: Last day of the Rooster in the 11th month.) On this day, Fujiwara no Norimichi, son of Michinaga, had the role of the Emperor's substitute. After a night of merriment, a joke is played on the Naidaijin by making him believe (Note: Through the content a characteristics of the present themselves.) that a present he had received is directly from the Empress; thus requiring an open return. Murasaki Shikibu goes on to describe how noble and dignified Norimichi looked on that day and how his nurse was overwhelmed by his appearance. In a sacred dance performed at night, the mediocre performance of one dancer who had been "very handsome last year" reminded Murasaki Shikibu "of the fleeting life of us all". The illustration associated with this scene shows the Imperial Messenger, Fujiwara no Norimichi, his head decorated with wisteria branches on the top of a staircase of a shrine building. The train of his garment is flowing down the staircase and he is watched by three courtiers positioned near the bottom of the stairs. (Note: For an ukiyo-e reproduction of the painting see Murasaki Shikibu Nikki Emaki n.d., pp. 12–14.)

==== Thinking of the first time at court ====
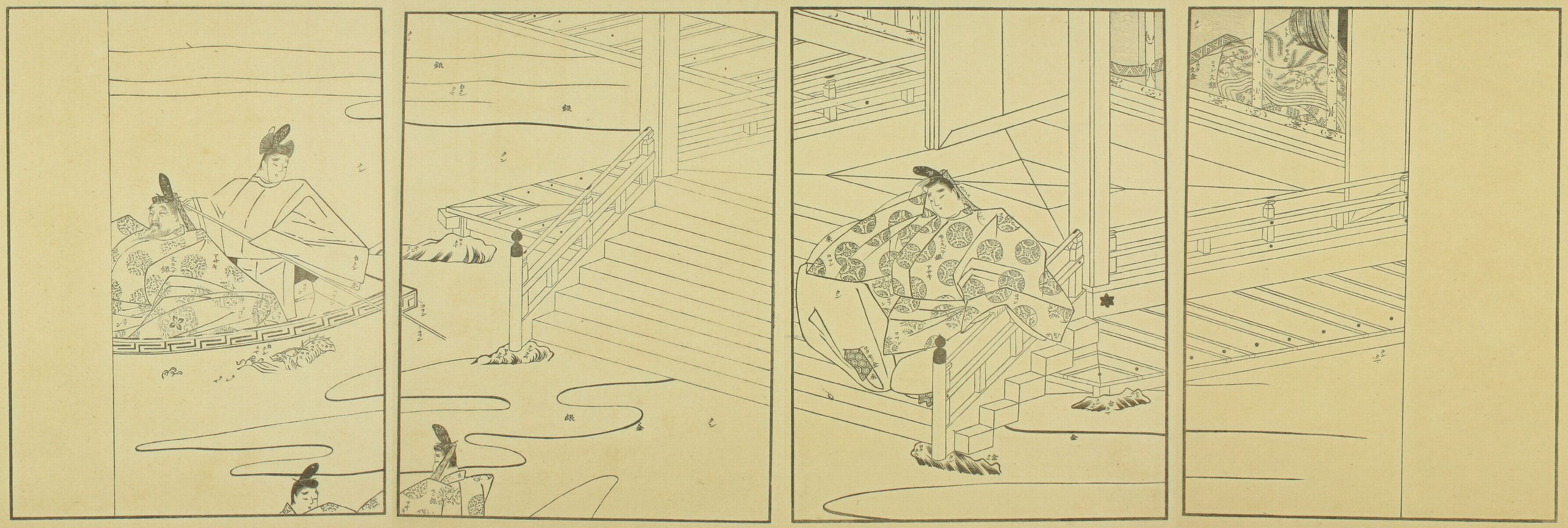
Ukiyo-e reproduction of 2nd painting

Set on the evening of Kankō 5, 12th month, 29th day (27 January 1009), in this scene, Murasaki Shikibu returns to the Imperial Court after a visit to her parents' home. As it is the anniversary of her coming to the court she is looking back at her former life nostalgically. Feeling lonely she goes to sleep murmuring the following waka:

My life and the year are closing together.
At the sound of the wind dreary is my heart.

The painting following this text section shows a man on the stairs of a house and two men on a boat just outside the house. The illustration matching the scene described in the text is now the fifth painting of the Hachisuka scroll. (Note: For an ukiyo-e reproduction of the painting see Murasaki Shikibu Nikki Emaki n.d., pp. 15–17.)

==== Incident at night ====
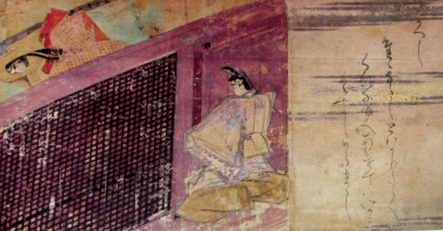
All the night through, knocking louder than a water-rail, I stood in vain at the door of hinoki wood weary and lamenting.

This scene from an unknown day in the year Kankō 6 (1009) shows Murasaki asleep at night in a room close to the corridor; a man is knocking on the door. Afraid to open, she spends the night without making a sound. The next morning her nightly visitor reveals himself as Michinaga through a poem he sent to her. She replies with the lines:

A cause of deep regret, indeed,
Had the door opened at the knocking of the water-rail!

==== 50th day celebration of Atsunaga-shinnō ====
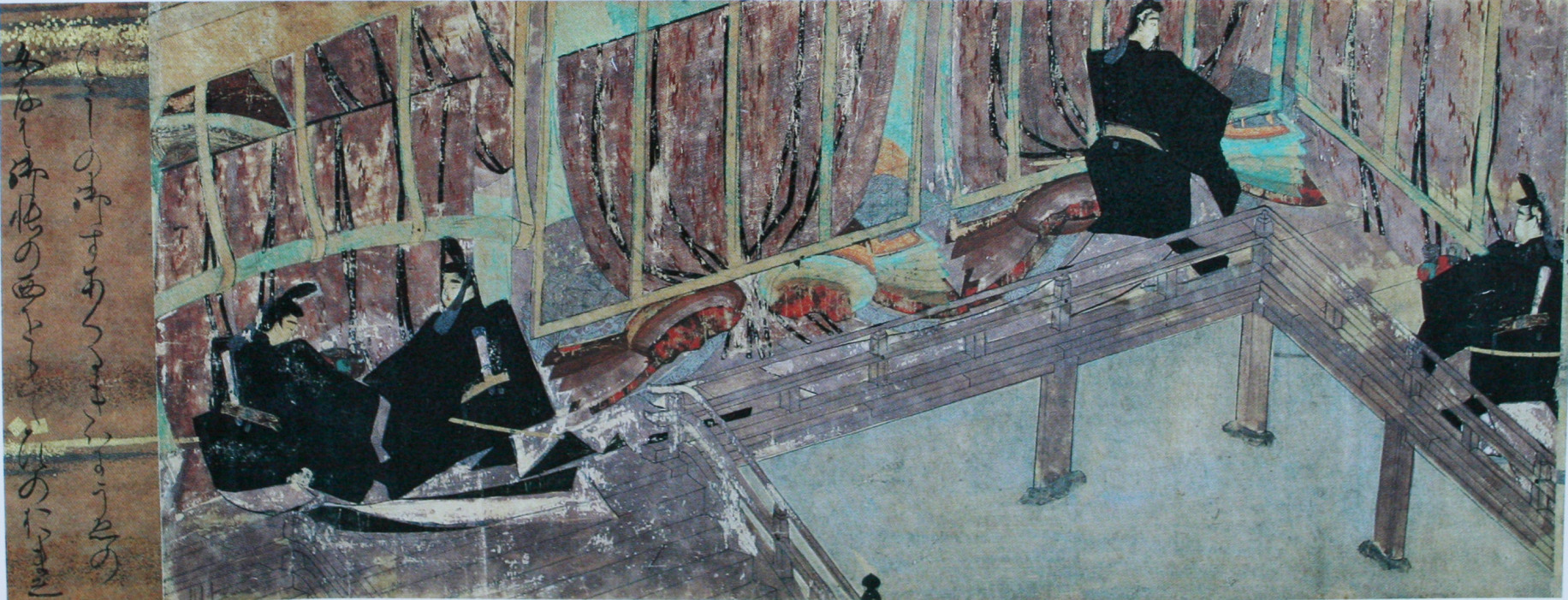
Courtiers carrying food on the balconies of a building.

Scenes four to six describe the 50th day celebration of the birth of Atsunaga-shinnō, the later Emperor Go-Suzaku, on Kankō 7, 1st month, 15th day (1 February 1010). The lengthy fourth section of text is split into two parts. Murasaki Shikibu briefly mentions her friendly relationship with Lady Kokosho and that they join their rooms separating them by kichō partitions only when both are at home. This behaviour made Michinaga believe that they are gossiping about other people. Murasaki Shikibu then describes the day's festivities: the Queen and her audience, the clothing, names and titles of the participants which included the Emperor, the infant prince and various court ladies. Dazzled in their presence, she escapes to an inner room. As the nurse, Madam Nakadaka comes away from the Emperor and Queen under the canopy, carrying the prince in her arms, Murasaki Shikibu praises her dignified demeanour, tranquility and earnestness. The painting associated with this scene shows four courtiers on the balcony (engawa) of a Japanese style building outside fabric enclosed rooms, which are not visible. Two of the men are shown walking, the others are kneeling and appear to be talking to a person inside the building or to be handing something to someone inside. Two of the men (one standing, one walking) carry trays with cups. (Note: For an ukiyo-e reproduction of the full painting see Murasaki Shikibu Nikki Emaki n.d., pp. 21–22. For a recent reproduction of the full painting see this image.)

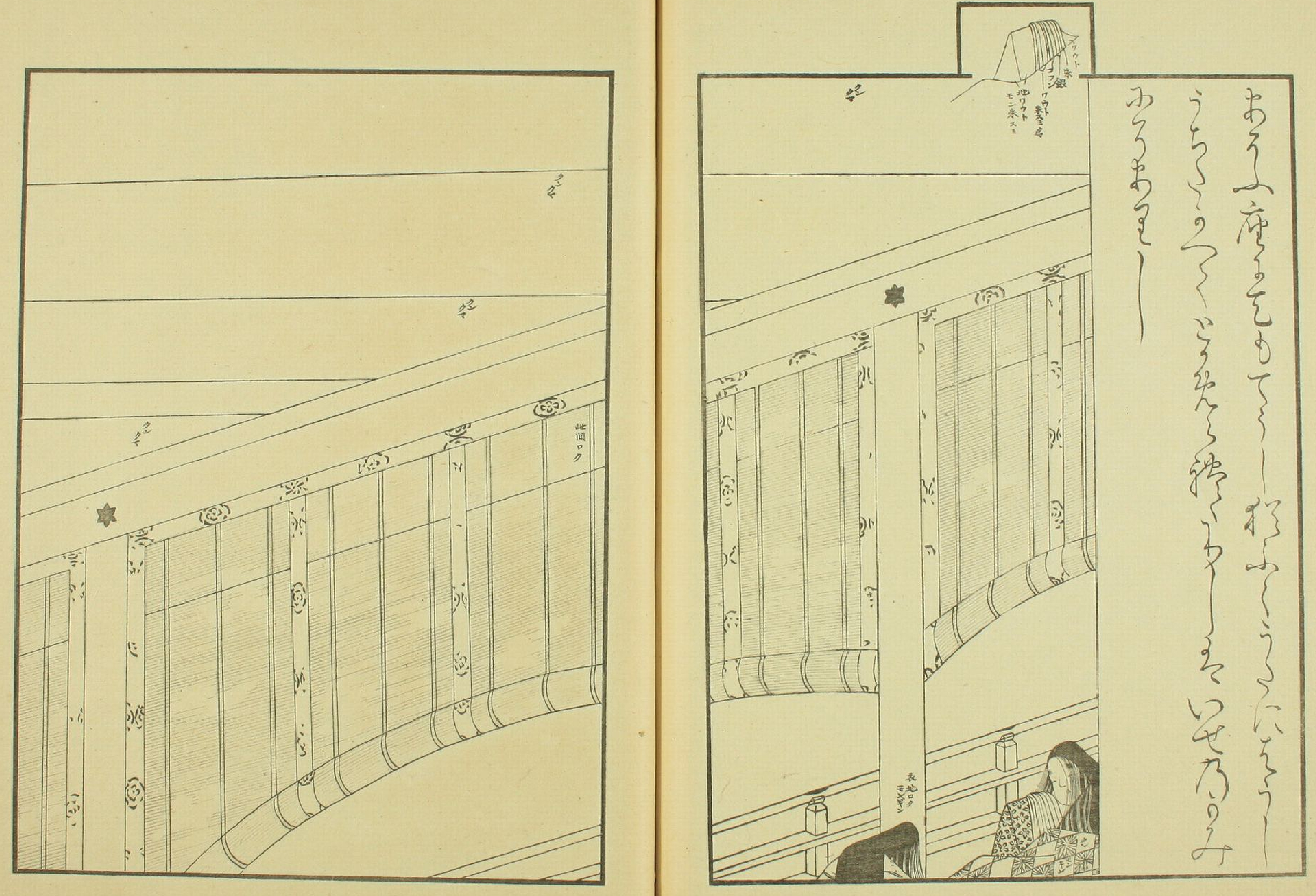
Ukiyo-e reproduction of 5th painting

In the subsequent scene, the dais at which the main persons are seated, covered by misu, is opened and Murasaki Shikibu notes that the people present at the event and seated around the dais on the balcony were either of high rank or court ladies. Lower rank officials later joined them on the steps below where the royalty is seated to perform music with a lute (biwa), harp (koto) and flute (shō). The painting corresponding to this scene shows two ladies on the balcony with rolled up misu. Both are squeezed in the corner of the image and appear to be talking to each other. (Note: For an ukiyo-e reproduction of the painting see Murasaki Shikibu Nikki Emaki n.d., p. 24.)

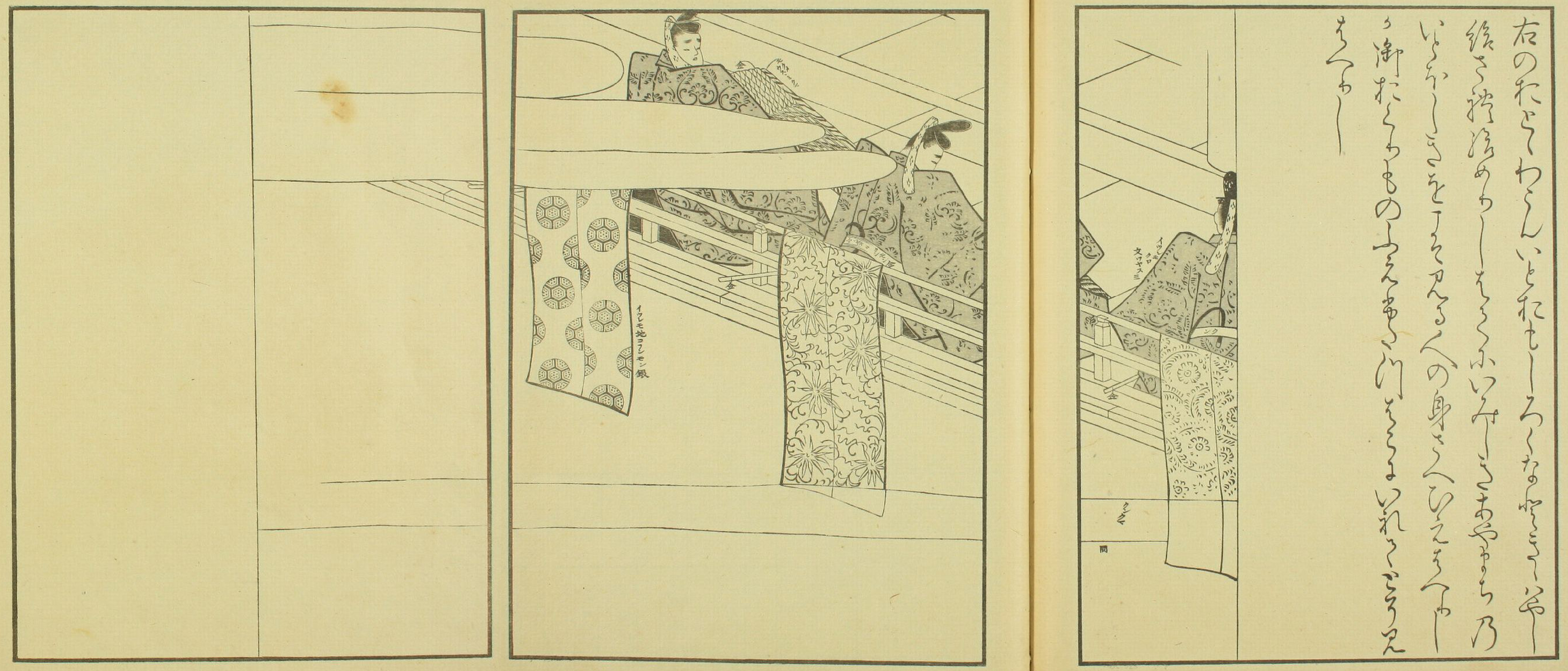
Ukiyo-e reproduction of 6th painting

A short text section follows, which is the final scene of the scroll and the final part of the known diary. The official musicians mentioned in the previous scene are joined by outsiders, one of which "made a mistake in the notes and was hissed". The Minister of the Right made a great mistake in praising the six-stringed koto. The emaki text (and diary) ends abruptly with mention of Michinaga's gift of flutes in two boxes. The illustration to this scene shows three courtiers seated in a row on the balcony with their backs facing the outside. The left figure is shown with a Japanese harp (koto) in front of him, his head is turned toward the other two who appear to be concentrating on something in front of them (likely instruments). (Note: For an ukiyo-e reproduction of the full painting see Murasaki Shikibu Nikki Emaki n.d., pp. 25–26.)

== See also ==
List of National Treasures of Japan (paintings)
