= Genji Monogatari Emaki =

12th-century illustrated handscroll

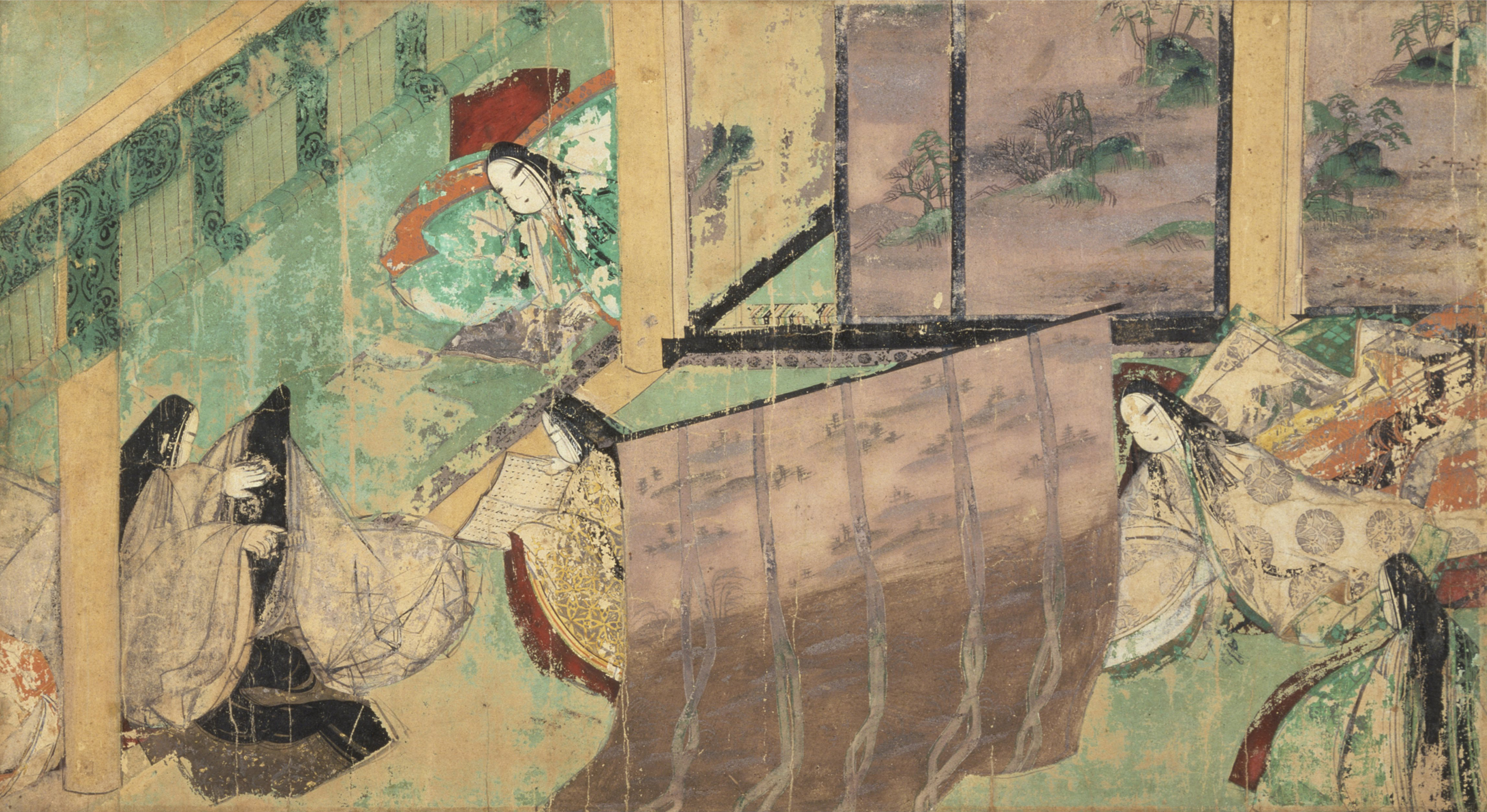
A scene of Azumaya from the scroll owned by Tokugawa Art Museum

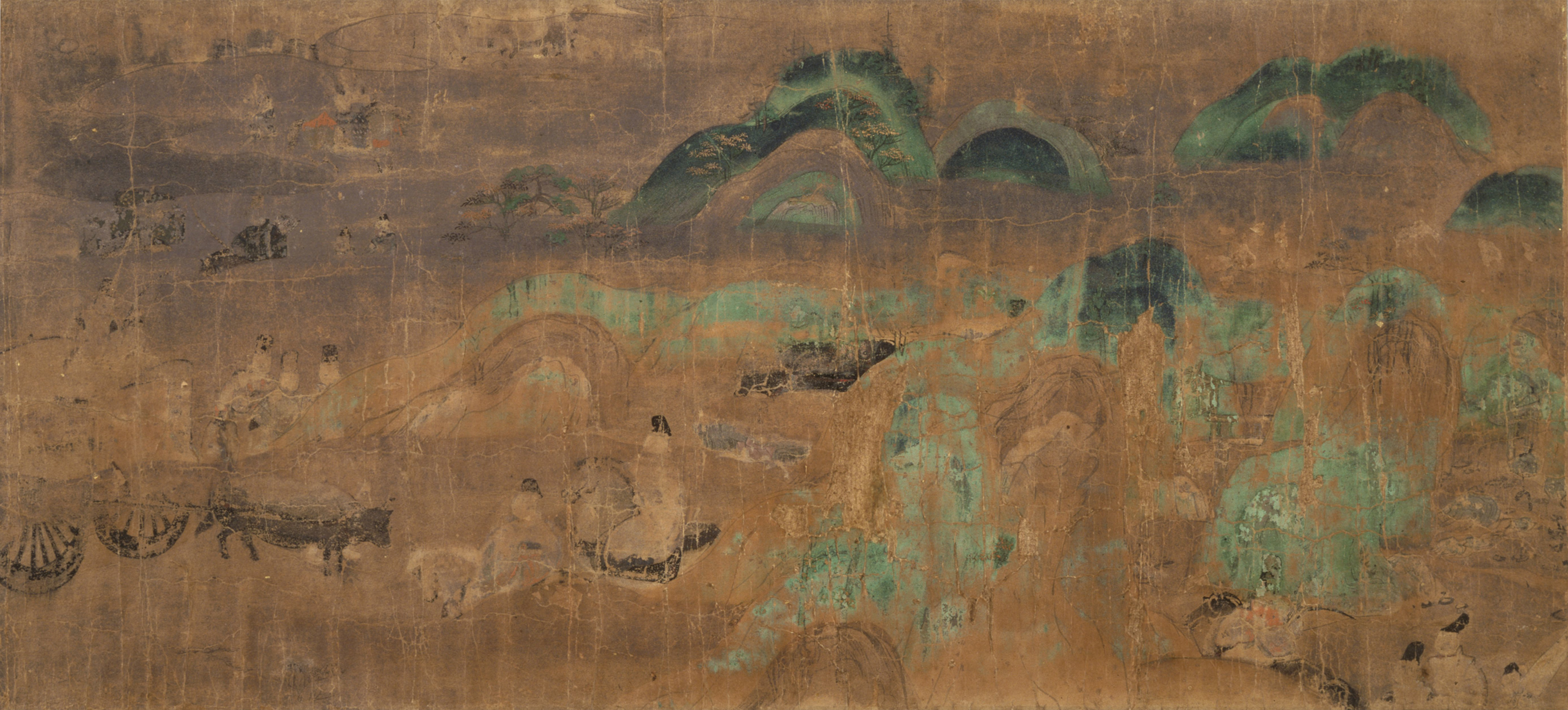
Landscape scene from the "Seki-ya" chapter, Tokugawa Art Museum

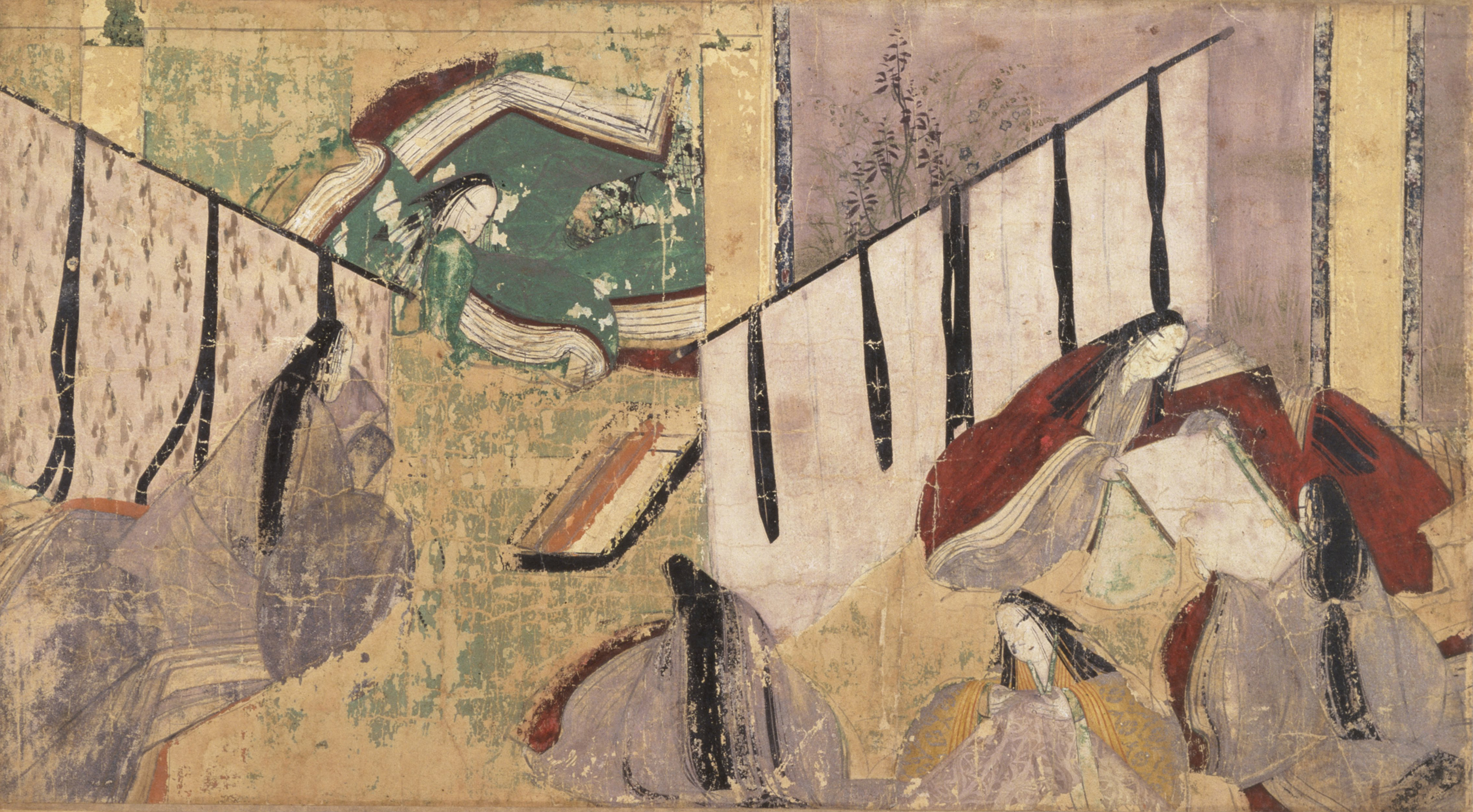
The "sawarabi" scene, Tokugawa Art Museum

The Genji Monogatari Emaki (源氏物語絵巻), also called The Tale of Genji Scroll, is a famous illustrated handscroll of the Japanese literature classic The Tale of Genji, produced during the 12th century, perhaps c. 1120–1140. The surviving sections, now broken up and mounted for conservation reasons, represent only a small portion of the original work (if it was complete) and are now divided between two museums in Japan, Tokugawa Art Museum and the Gotoh Museum, where they are only briefly exhibited, again for conservation reasons. Both groups are National Treasures of Japan. It is the earliest surviving text of the work and the earliest surviving work in the Yamato-e tradition of narrative illustrated scrolls, which has continued to impact Japanese art, arguably up to the present day. The painted images in the scroll show a tradition and distinctive conventions that are already well developed, and may well have been several centuries in the making.

== History ==
The word emaki stems from the word "emakimono" meaning "picture scrolls". The emakimono picture scrolls consisted of two designs: Pictures that were painted on a scroll with text added to the same scroll or a number of paintings that accompanied passages of text and were joined together in a scroll. The first known picture scroll was produced in Japan during the late ninth or tenth century. The Genji Monogatari picture scroll, however, was produced in the early twelfth century. Not only is the Genji Monogatari Emaki the oldest surviving monogatari scroll but it is also the oldest surviving non-Buddhist scroll in Japan. There is no exact date to the scroll, but it is estimated to being sometime between 1120 and 1140, in which case it was created just a little over a century after Murasaki Shikibu wrote The Tale of Genji.

The Genji Monogatari Emaki scroll differs in almost all values and art styles of the Chinese which leads to the assumption that the Genji Monogatari Emaki comes from Japanese art forms. The purpose of the construction of the scroll was to provide a visual depiction, and further explanation, of the novel The Tale of Genji.

== Dimensions ==
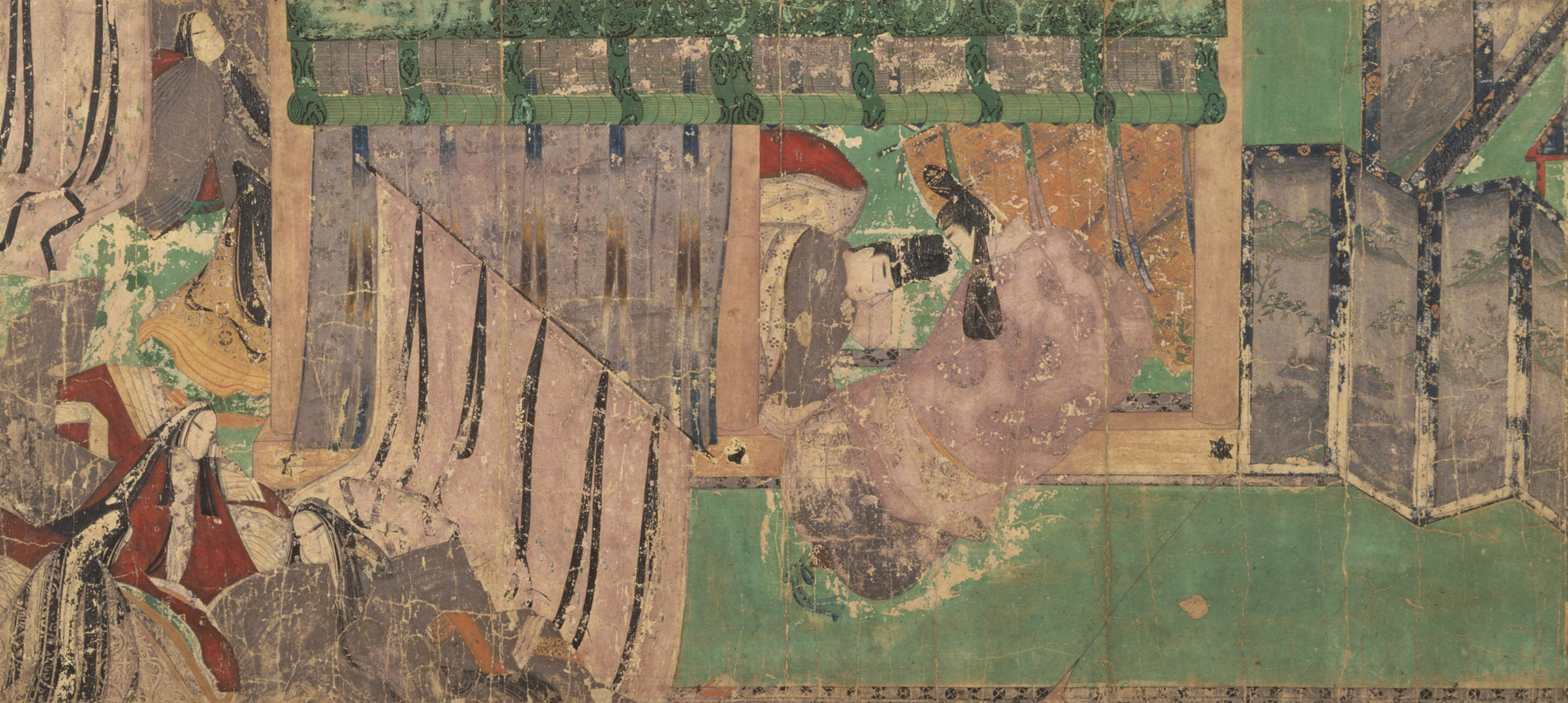
A scene of Kashiwagi. All paintings were produced by "tsukuri-e" process.

The original scroll was about 450 feet long. It consisted of twenty rolls, contained over 100 paintings, and had over 300 sheets of calligraphy. The surviving scrolls of The Genji Monogatari Emaki, however, are not a complete depiction of The Tale of Genji. It consists of only 19 paintings, 65 sheets of text, and 9 pages of fragments housed in the Tokugawa Art Museum in Nagoya and the Gotoh Museum in Tokyo. The surviving scroll amounts to about 15 percent of the original scroll.

== Design ==
Until relatively recently, the scroll was believed to be the work of Fujiwara no Takayoshi, a well known Court painter of the twelfth century. However, after continued research, this belief has been revised, and both the identity of the illustrator and the organisation of its production remain unknown. Because of the techniques used, it is obvious that various calligraphers and artists with connections to Takayoshi produced the scroll. The characteristic pictorial technique of the scroll is known as "tsukuri-e" meaning "manufactured painting", which is an extension of yamato-e. The tsukuri-e style was hardly ever used by male painters but was almost always used by female paintings. This style is referred to in the actual novel The Tale of Genji as the process of applying paint to a black and white drawing. It also referred to the painter himself, as opposed to the artist who did the basic drawing.

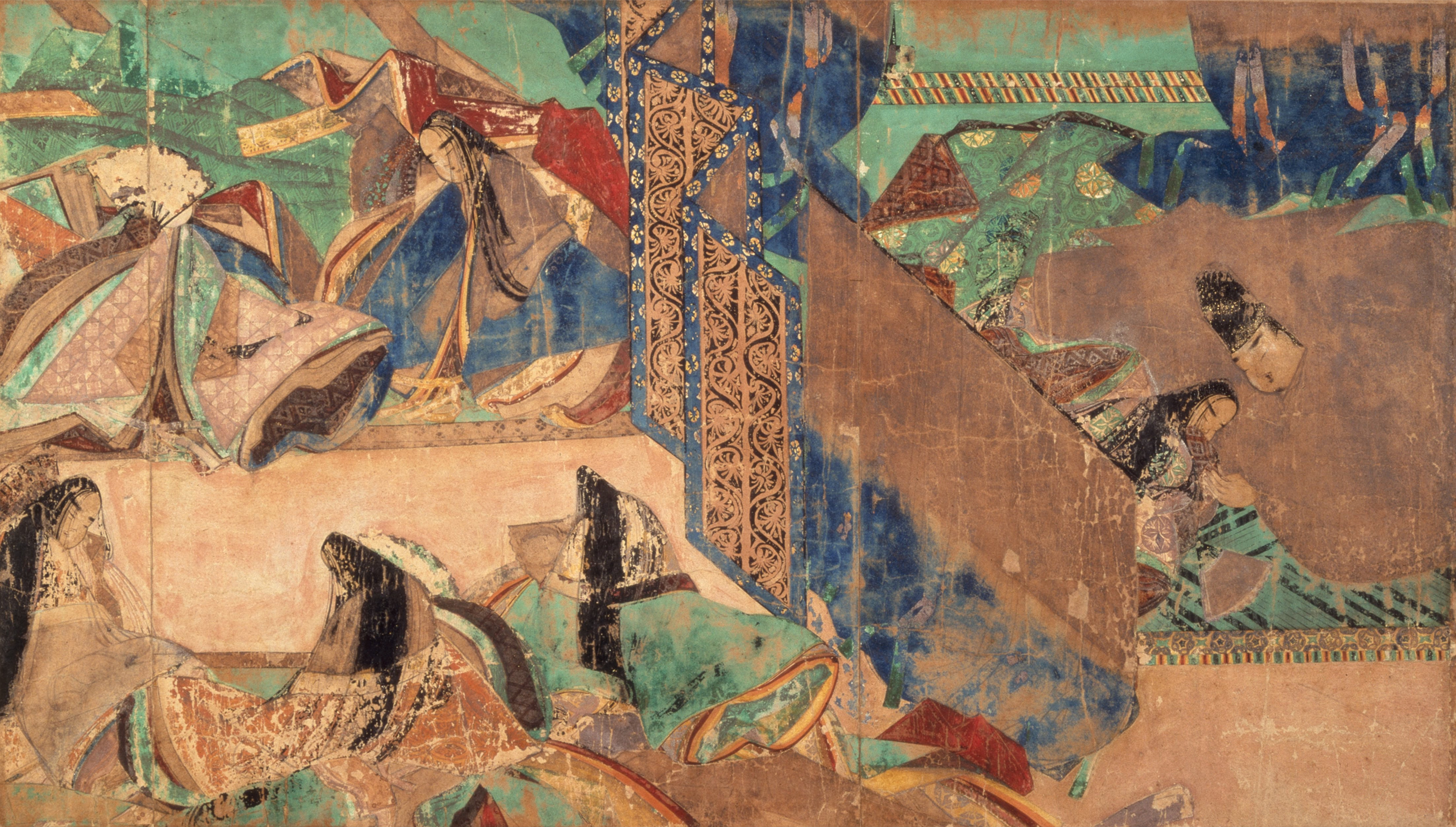
Scene from the "yadorigi gi" chapter

Yamato-e is a form of painting in which the underlying paper was covered entirely with heavy pigment. There are four steps to this process. In the first step, a series of scenes with noteworthy visual effects were chosen from the respective monogatari. In the second step, the piece is executed in a black and white drawing. Pigments were added to the basic drawing and the details are colored in the third step. In the last step, the original black lines, which are now covered by paint, were drawn back in with ink in order to make the picture stand out more. When deciding to represent the novel The Tale of Genji as a picture scroll, the people in charge wanted to use a style that would not jar with people's image of the novel. The decided to make all the scenes peaceful, elegant and static which reflected the dominant aesthetic attitude of the artists and the early twelfth century court aristocracy towards The Tale of Genji.

== Pictorial technique ==
The Genji Monogatari Emaki is characterized by two pictorial techniques: fukinuki yatai and hikime kagibana. Fukinuki yatai ("blown-off roof") refers to a form of composition that gives a bird's eye view of the interior of a building, with the roof and ceiling not shown. In some cases, interior partitions are omitted. The artists were very realistic with the architectural details of the scroll.

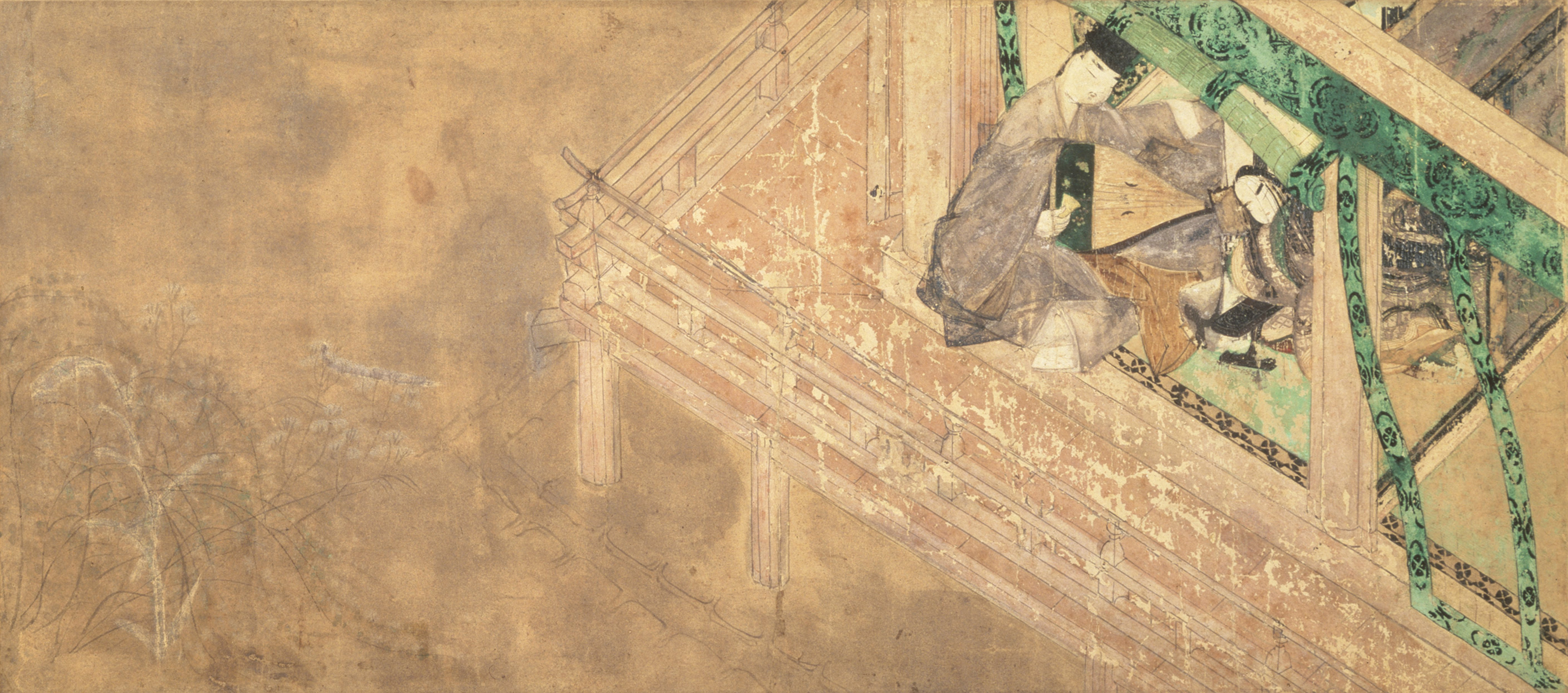
A scene of Yadorigi in "hikime kagibana" style.

Hikime kagibana style described the illustration of people with faces drawn with essentially identical features: slit eyes and hook nose. This technique takes place in all but one of the nineteen pictures in the scroll. Also characteristic of Hikime Kagibana, there is not a single full front view of a face throughout the entire scroll. There are only two different viewpoints used to show the faces. These viewpoints consist of an oblique angle of 30 degrees from the front and a right angle giving a straight profile. With the right angle the eyebrows and corners of the eyes are seen but the nose is invisible. This is a fictional depiction of a person because in actuality it is impossible to see the corner of someone's eye but not see their nose.

Although the illustration of architecture throughout the scroll is very realistic, the images of the faces are very unrealistic. This is said to be because the dominant figures in the novel The Tale of Genji were not a part of everyday life and were unfamiliar to the readers. They were instead figures of one's imagination from the past or a make believe world. It was intended for the readers to portray their own image of the figures while reading the novel. If the artists had created realistic portraits of the figures it would have interfered with the images that the readers had. Therefore, the artist chose to use the unrealistic technique of hikime kagibana so that the readers individual image of the figures could be preserved.

== Emotional aspects of the characters ==
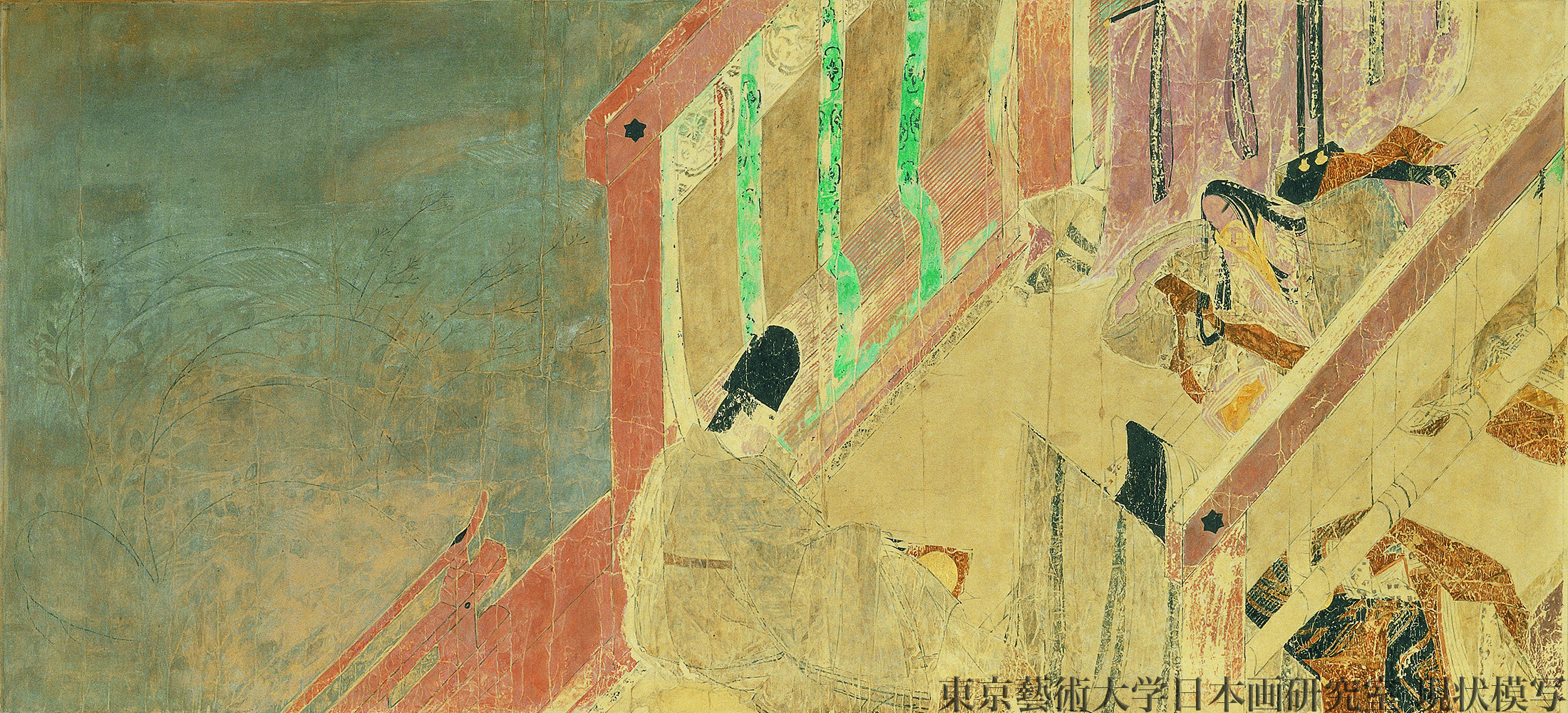
A scene from the "Minori" chapter depicting the death of Lady Murasaki

Although the technique of hikime kagibana was used for the drawing of the figure's faces, there was still a great amount of emotion that could be discerned from them. One way that the artists showed individual emotions in the figure's faces is through the placement and size of their facial features; such as the thickness of the eyebrows or lips, the angle of the eyebrows or eyes, and the space between the eyes and brows.

For example, in chapters 37 and 39 the depiction of Lady Kumoi is of a strong-willed young woman who has become prey to overwhelming jealousy. This depiction is done by making her eyebrows a bit stronger, tiny pupils that are a little lower, eyes slightly cast down, and her upper lip being just a little thicker.

Another way that the artists showed emotion in the characters was by the tilt of their faces. This was done by making the characters faces look away, or covering their faces by placing them in their hands, almost completely covering them, or showing them looking away. The artists also portrayed individual expressions and emotions to the characters by using inanimate elements. Some examples that were used throughout the scroll were autumn grasses and raindrops. The autumn grasses were used as a symbol of human emotion. The illustrations of chapters 36 ("Kashiwagi") and 38 ("Suzumushi") are notable for using architectural composition to convey emotional tension. In "Kashiwagi", a scene of betrayal and death, the ominously billowing edges of green and black silk curtains heighten the dramatic tension. In "Suzumushi", two men are shown conversing, separated by a slanted roof beam that seems to prevent them from openly acknowledging their true relationship, while the diagonal lines of the tatami mats symbolize the precarious nature of their bond.

== Calligraphy ==
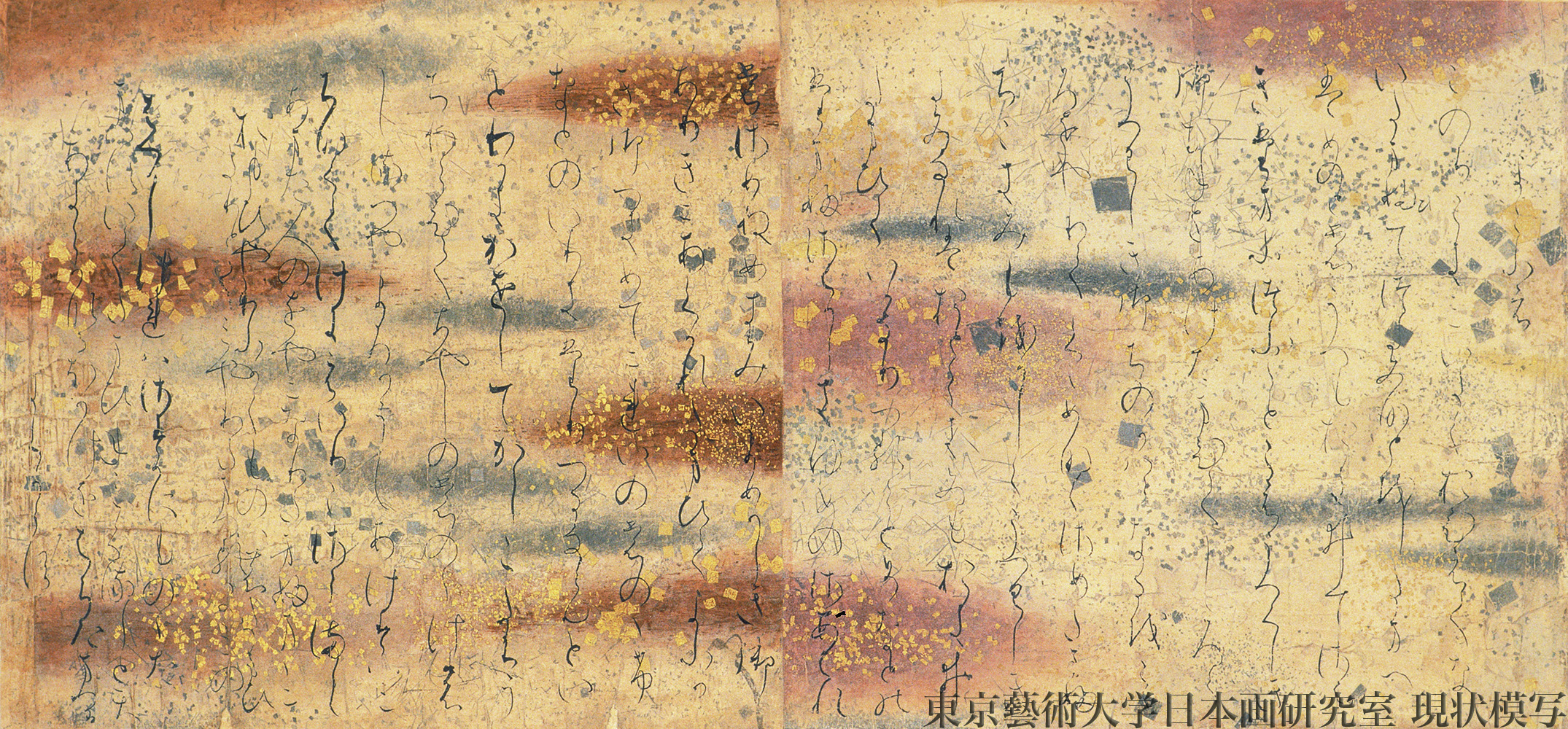
Calligraphy

The artists of The Tale of Genji scroll did not use just one style of calligraphy but many different styles. For example, they used marker styles that consisted of delicate flowing lines and others with definite brush strokes. The purpose of this style of calligraphy was more for aesthetic enjoyment of the design rather than for reading. Because of this style of calligraphy, the Genji Monogatari Emaki is almost impossible to decipher. Even amongst today's most educated Japanese people, only a few can successfully decipher it. Although it is unknown how well the Japanese people of that era could read, many believe that they, too, would have had a very difficult time. One reason given for using a writing style so difficult to read is that legibility would have taken away from the visual effect.

== Text ==
The textual fragments found in the scrolls are notable in that they preserve the oldest known form of the text of the Genji. This text is different in many respects from the standard Aobyōshi text associated with Fujiwara no Teika. The text found in the emaki as well as in the Genji shaku, the first Genji commentary, have allowed scholars to identify extant manuscripts that seem to preserve a pre-Teika form of the text. The best known of these is the Yomei-bunko Genji.

== See also ==
- Gotoh Museum
- List of National Treasures of Japan (paintings)

== Sources ==
- Morris, I. & Tokugawa, Y. (1971). The Tale of Genji Scroll. Japan: Kodansha International LTD.
- Okudaira, Hideo (1973). Narrative picture scrolls. Arts of Japan. Vol. 5. Weatherhill. ISBN 978-0-8348-2710-3.
- Paine, Robert Treat, in: Paine, R. T. & Soper A., "The Art and Architecture of Japan", Pelican History of Art, 3rd ed 1981, Penguin (now Yale History of Art), ISBN 0140561080
- Shirane, Haruo (2008). Envisioning the Tale of Genji: =media, gender, and cultural production. Columbia University Press. ISBN 978-0-231-14237-3.
- (2000). Genji monogatari (Tale of Genji). Retrieved from http://www.dartmouth.edu/~arth17/Genji.html
- Stylistic appeal of genji monogatari emaki. Retrieved from https://web.archive.org/web/20071018212210/http://www.geocities.com/sljohnson1980/genji1.htm
