= Fukinuki yatai =

Fukinuki yatai (吹抜屋台) describes a feature of Japanese art particularly associated with e-maki painted scrolls, famously for example, yamato-e.

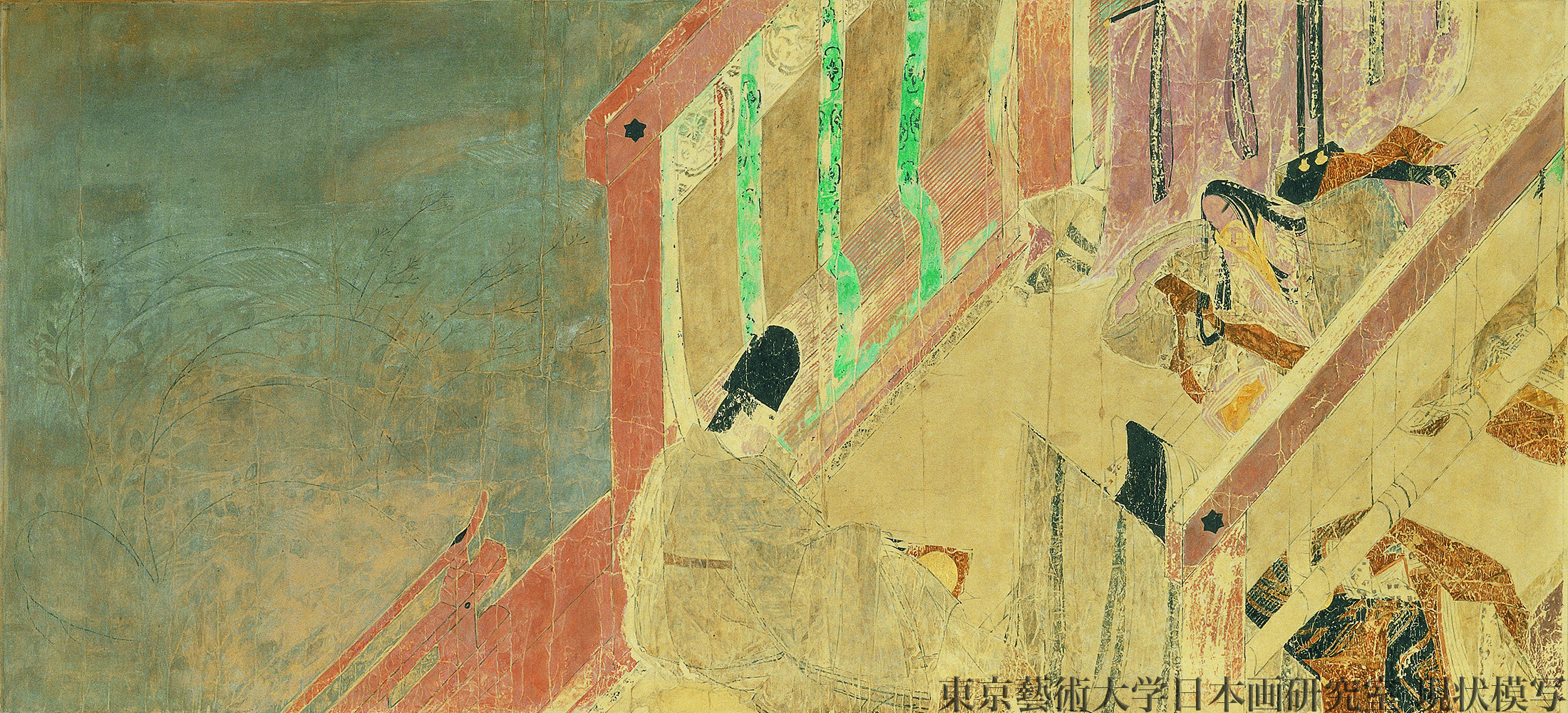
Scene depicting the death of Lady Murasame on the Genji monogatari emaki.

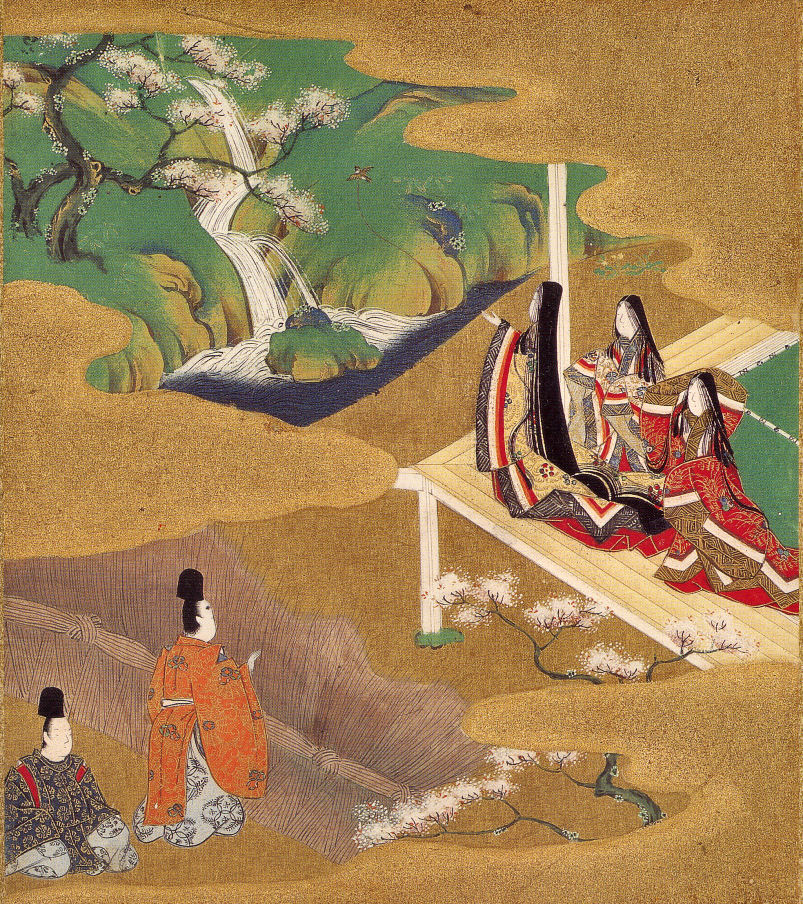
Scene from The Tale of Genji by Tosa Mitsuoki, from the 17th century Tosa school revival of the yamato-e.

Literally meaning "blown off roof", fukinuki yatai relates to the depiction of both interior and exterior environments - including rooms, screens, and architecture where the roof and walls are removed and the beams are preserved. The basic visual feature depicts the interior scene from an upper diagonal with the roof, ceiling, and sometimes inner partitions removed. From an artistic perspective, it also importantly describes the composition by which character relations, or even feelings, are depicted in the layout.

This technique was used in early Japanese Heian period scrolls with very few exceptions until realism in Kamakura period art flourished. The rudimentary function of fukinuki yatai was to portrait multiple narrative stories on the same painting using different spaces. The earliest usage of fukinuki yatai was found in the biography of Prince Shōtoku (聖徳太子絵伝). Other typical examples are found in the Genji Monogatari Emaki, the Murasaki Shikibu Diary Emaki, and the Kasuga Gongen Genki E.
