= Handscroll =

Long narrow scroll for displaying painting and calligraphy

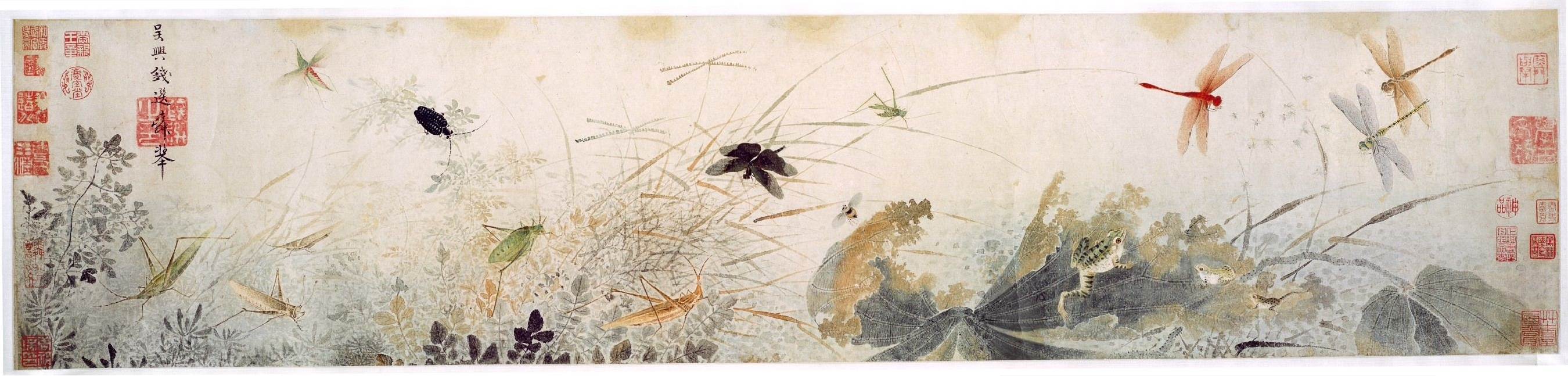
- Section of a 13th century handscroll painting, Early Autumn by Song dynasty painter Qian Xuan.

Chinese name
- Chinese: 手捲
Transcriptions
Standard Mandarin
- Hanyu Pinyin: shǒujuàn

Japanese name
- Kanji: 手巻物
Transcriptions
- Romanization: Temaki-mono

The handscroll is a long, narrow, horizontal scroll format in East Asia used for calligraphy or paintings. A handscroll usually measures up to several meters in length and around 25–40 cm in height. Handscrolls are generally viewed starting from the right end. This kind of scroll is intended to be read or viewed flat on a table, in sections. The format thus allows for the depiction of a continuous narrative or journey.

The traditional alternative format in East Asian paintings is the vertical hanging scroll, which is rarely as long.

== History ==
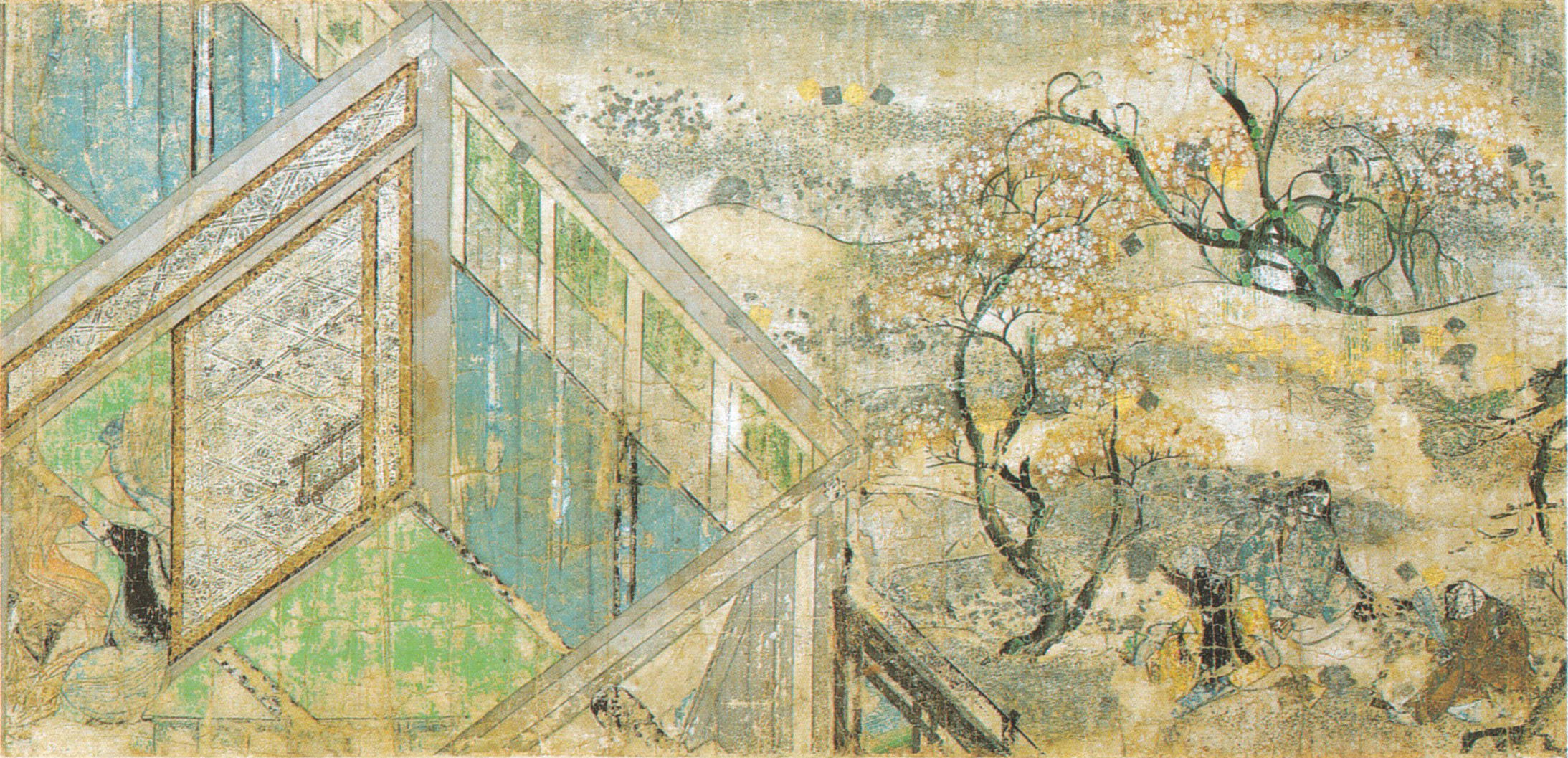
Japanese, section of the Nezame Monogatari Emaki, 12th century

According to the National Palace Museum in Taipei, the handscroll format originated with ancient Chinese text documents. From the Spring and Autumn period (770–481 BC) through the Han dynasty (206 BC – 220 AD), bamboo or wooden slips were bound together and used to write texts on. During the Eastern Han period (25–220), the use of paper and silk in the handscroll format became more common. The handscroll was one of the main formats for texts up until the Tang dynasty (618–907). From the Three Kingdoms period (220–280), the handscroll became a standard format for paintings. New styles were developed over time.

Handscrolls were introduced to Japan centuries later through the spread of Buddhism. The earliest extant Japanese handscroll was created in the eighth century and deals with the life of the Buddha. Japanese horizontal picture scrolls are called emakimono (or emaki), and more often cover narrative subjects than their Chinese equivalents.

== Description ==
A handscroll has a backing of protective and decorative silk (包首) usually bearing a small title label (題簽) on it. In Chinese art, the handscroll usually consists of a frontispiece (引首) at the beginning (right side), the artwork (畫心) itself in the middle, and a colophon section (拖尾) at the end for various inscriptions. The beginning of the scroll, where the frontispiece was located, is known as the "heaven" (天頭). Vertical strips (隔水) are sometimes used to separate the different sections. Most handscrolls contain only one painting, although several short paintings can also be mounted on the scroll. At the beginning of the scroll is a wooden stave (天杆), which serves as a support. A silk cord (帶子) and a fastener (別子) is attached to the stave and used to secure the rolled-up scroll. A wooden roller (木杆) is attached at the very end, around which the scroll is rolled.

== Examples ==
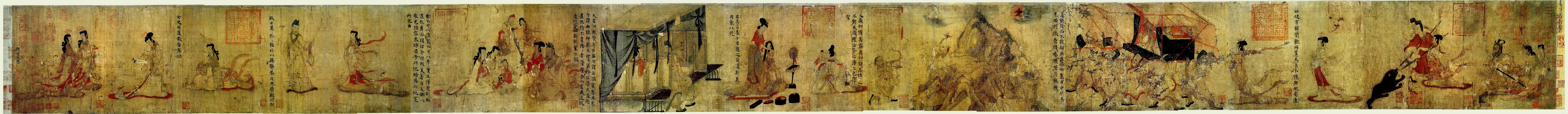
The extant nine scenes of the Admonitions of the Court Instructress, scene 4 at the right to scene 12 at the left
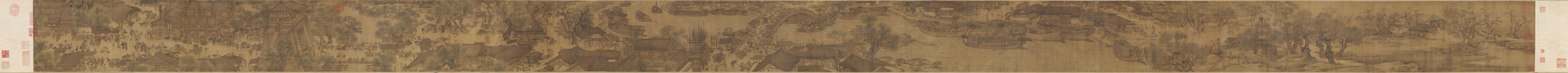
Panorama of Along the River During the Qingming Festival by Zhang Zeduan (1085–1145)
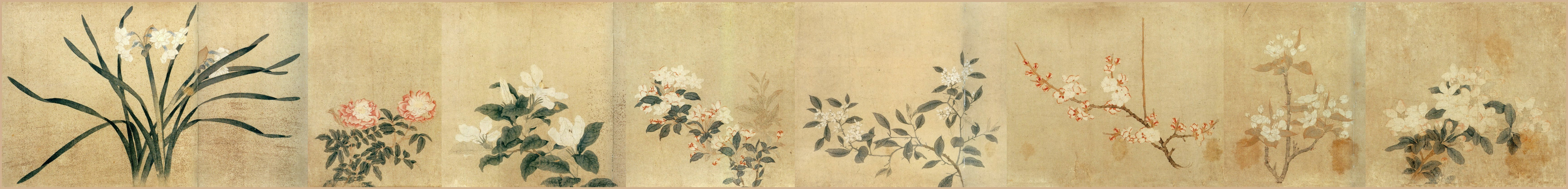
Eight Flowers by Qian Xuan (1235–1305)
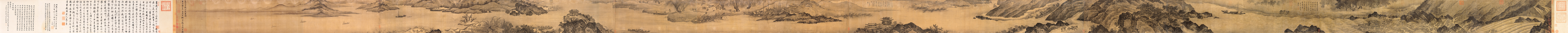
Ten Thousand Miles of the Yangtze River, Ming dynasty (1368–1644)
