= Hikime kagibana =

Hikime kagibana (引目鉤鼻) describes a feature of illustration continuing in the repertoire of Japanese Art from the Heian period through the Kamakura period, most notably in yamato-e e-maki. Its influence can be traced right up the Edo-period ukiyo-e or later.

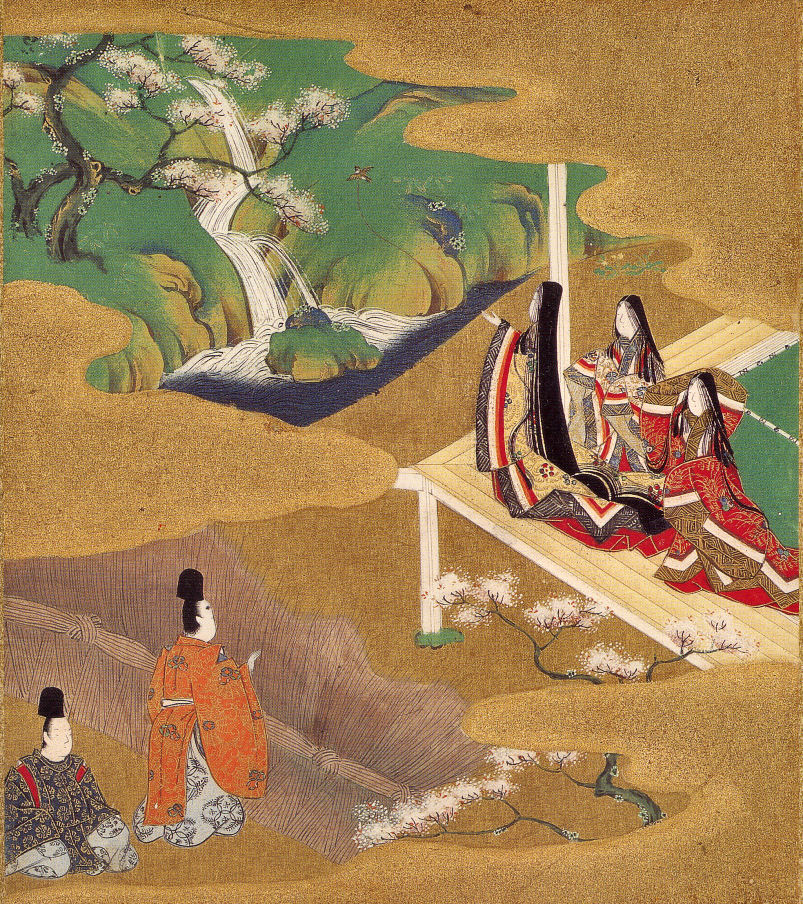
Scene from The Tale of Genji by Tosa Mitsuoki, from the 17th century Tosa school revival of the yamato-e

Works done in the hikime kagibana style show faces with essentially identical features.: slit eyes and hook nose. The Hikime Kagibana style also does not allow a full front view of a face. There are only two main viewpoints used to depict faces: an oblique angle of 30 degrees from the front and a right angle giving a profile. When faces are shown from a right angle, the eyebrows and corners of the eyes are visible but the nose is not – something that is not possible in actuality.
