= Heiji Monogatari Emaki =

Painted narrative handscroll)

- 平治物語絵巻 (Japanese)
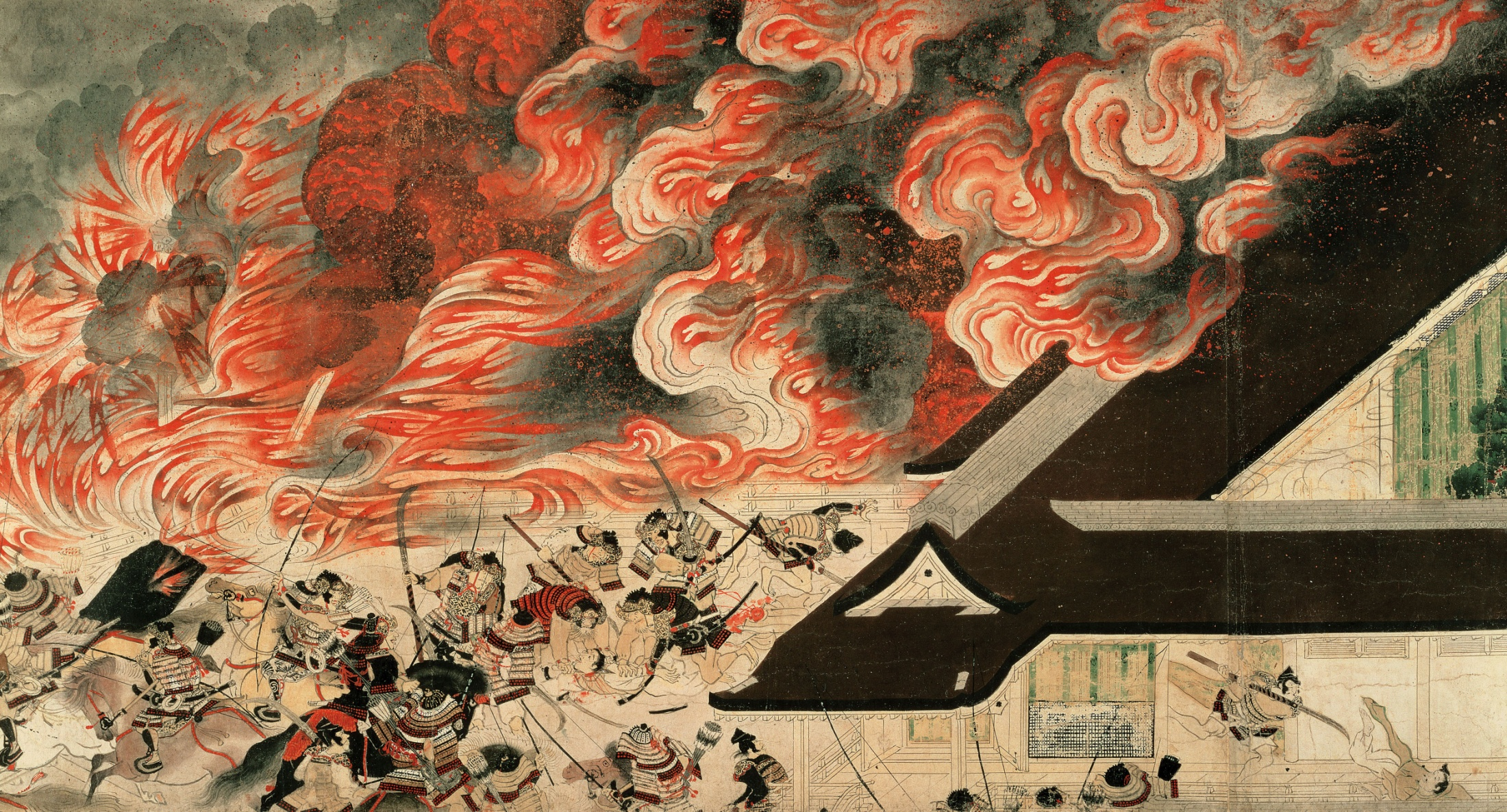
- The famous scene of the fire at Sanjō Palace, with a sequence of battle and barbarism at the foot of the scroll (Sanjō Palace fire scroll)
- Artist: Unknown
- Completion date: Second half of the 13th century
- Medium: Emakimono; Paint and ink on paper handscroll
- Movement: Yamato-e
- Subject: Heiji rebellion
- Designation: National Treasure
- Location: Museum of Fine Arts, Boston; Seikadō Bunko Art Museum; Tokyo National Museum

The Heiji Monogatari Emaki (平治物語絵巻; "The Tale of Heiji Emaki", or sometimes "The Tale of Heiji Ekotoba"; also translated as the "Heiji Rebellion Scrolls") is an emakimono or emaki (painted narrative handscroll) from the second half of the 13th century, in the Kamakura period of Japanese history (1185–1333). An illuminated manuscript, it narrates the events of the Heiji rebellion (1159–1160) between the Taira and Minamoto clans, one of several precursors to the broader Genpei War (1180–1185) between the same belligerents.

Both the author and the sponsor of the work remain unknown, and its production probably spanned several decades. Nowadays, only three original scrolls and a few fragments of a fourth remain; they are held by the Museum of Fine Arts, Boston, the Seikadō Bunko Art Museum, Tokyo, and the Tokyo National Museum. The civil wars for the domination of Japan at the end of the Heian period, which ended with the victory of the Minamoto clan in the Genpei War, had a strong effect on the course of history in Japan. They have also been illustrated in many artworks, including the Heiji Monogatari Emaki, which has inspired many artists up until modern times.

The paintings in the work, in the Yamato-e style, are distinguished by both the dynamism of lines and movement and the vivid colours, as well as a realistic impetus characteristic of the arts of the Kamakura period. Cruelty, massacres and barbarities are also reproduced without any attenuation. The result is a "new style particularly suited to the vitality and confidence of the Kamakura period". In several scrolls, long painted sequences introduced by short calligraphy passages are carefully composed in such a way as to create the tragic and the epic, such as the passage of the fire at Sanjō Palace, deeply studied by art historians.

== Background ==
=== Emakimono arts ===
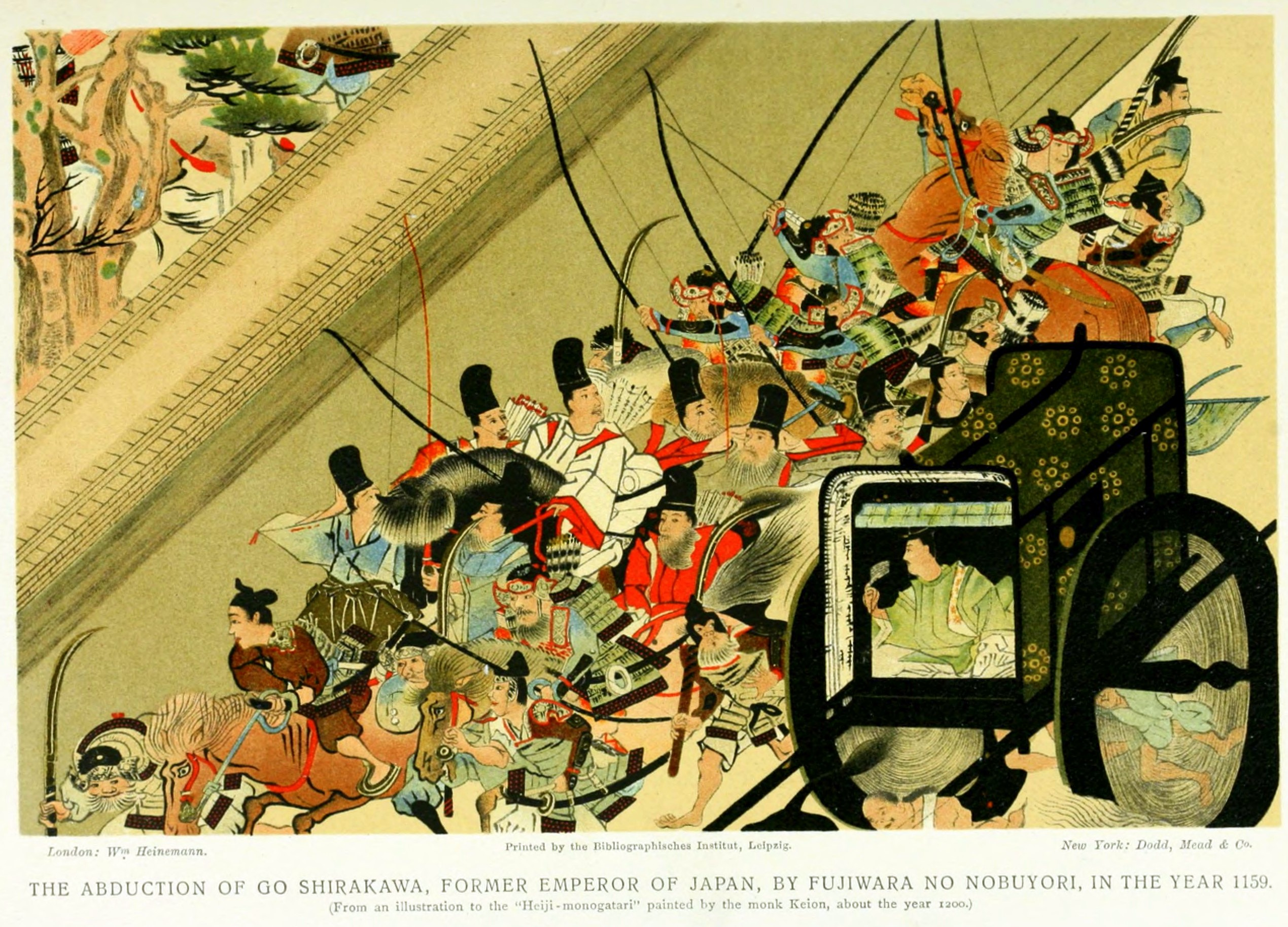
Emperor Go-Shirakawa and his escort fleeing from the attack by the Minamoto clan on Sanjō Palace (Sanjō Palace fire scroll)

Originating in Japan in the sixth or seventh century through trade with the Chinese Empire, emakimono art spread widely among the aristocracy in the Heian period. An emakimono consists of one or more long rolls of paper narrating a story through Yamato-e texts and paintings. The reader discovers the story by progressively unrolling the scroll with one hand while rewinding it with the other hand, from right to left (according to the then horizontal writing direction of Japanese script), so that only a portion of text or image of about 60 cm (24 in) is visible.

The narrative of an emakimono assumes a series of scenes, the rhythm, composition and transitions of which are entirely the artist's sensitivity and technique. The themes of the stories were very varied: illustrations of novels, historical chronicles, religious texts, biographies of famous people, humorous or fantastic anecdotes, etc.

The Kamakura period, the advent of which followed a period of political turmoil and civil wars, was marked by the coming to power of the warrior class (the samurai). Artistic production was very strong, and more varied themes and techniques than before were explored, signalling the "golden age" of emakimono (the 12th and 13th centuries). Under the impetus of the new warrior class in power, emakimono evolved towards a more realistic and composite pictorial style. Paintings of military and historical chronicles were particularly appreciated by the new ruling warrior class; ancient documents identify many emakimono on these subjects, including the Hōgen Monogatari Emaki (no longer extant), which recounted the Hōgen rebellion, the Mōko Shūrai Ekotoba on the Mongol invasions, and of course the emakimono the subject of the present article. According to Miyeko Murase, the epic battles transcribed in those emakimono must have strongly marked the minds of the Japanese, because the artists had made the battle theme enduring.

=== The Heiji rebellion ===
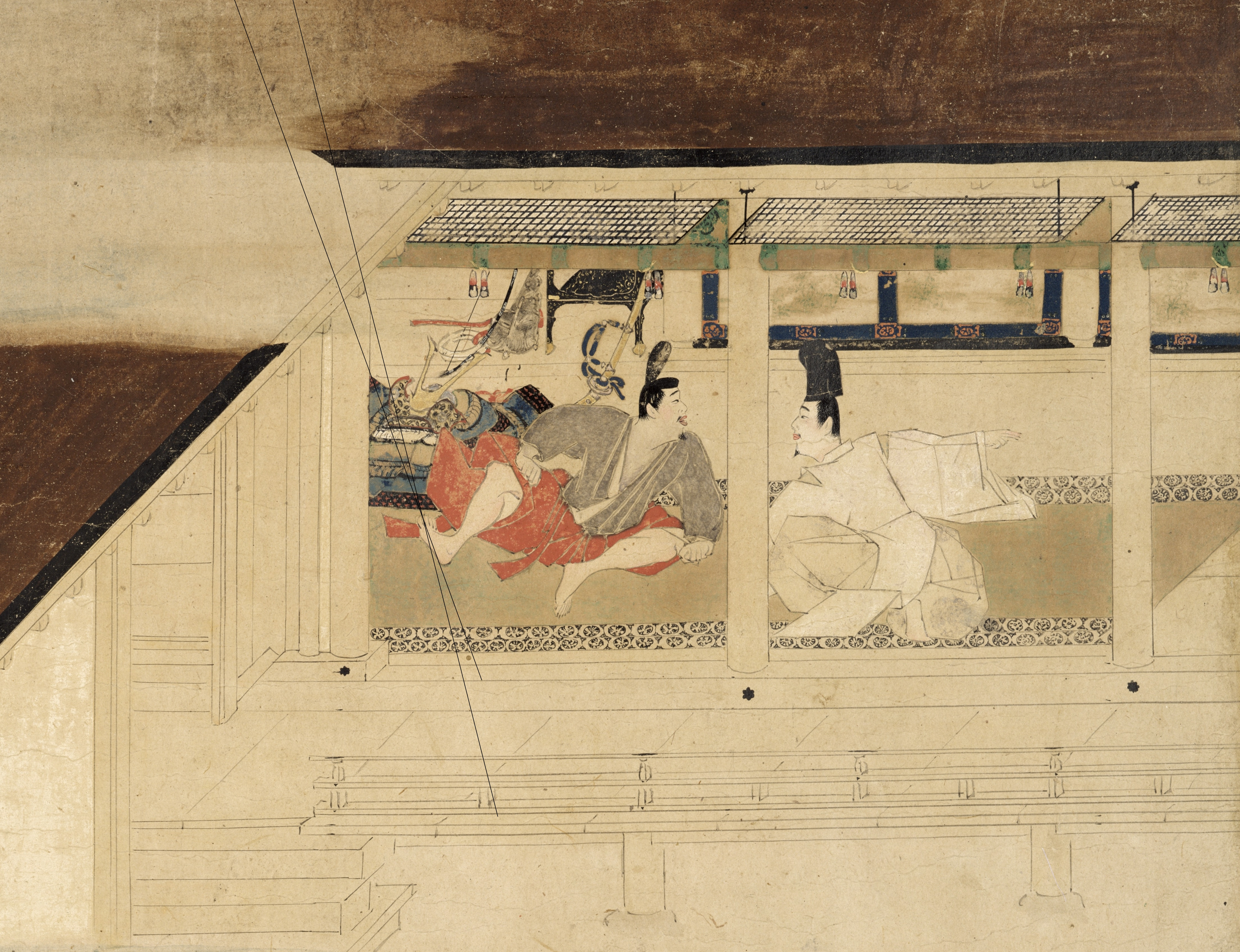
In the Emperor's room, Fujiwara no Nobuyori learns of the flight of Emperor Nijō, whom he was holding prisoner (Emperor Nijō's flight scroll)

The work describes the Heiji rebellion (1159–1160), one of the episodes of the historical transition period that saw Japan enter the Kamakura period and the Middle Ages: the Imperial Court lost all political power in favour of the feudal lords led by the shogun. During this transition, the authority of the emperors and the Fujiwara regents weakened due to corruption, the growing independence of local chiefs (daimyos), starvation and even superstition, so that the two main clans of the time vied for control of the state: the Taira clan and the Minamoto clan.

Relations between the two clans deteriorated and political plots were asserted, so much so that in early 1160, the Minamoto clan attempted a coup by besieging Sanjō Palace in Kyoto to kidnap Retired Emperor Go-Shirakawa and his son Emperor Nijō. It was the start of the Heiji rebellion. The Taira, led by Taira no Kiyomori, hastily gathered its strength to retaliate; it took the advantage and decimated the rival clan, except for the young children. Ironically, among these children spared was Minamoto no Yoritomo who, a generation later in the Genpei War (1180–1185), would avenge his father and take control of all of Japan, establishing the political domination of the warriors in the new Kamakura period, from which the emakimono dates.

The Heiji rebellion, famous in Japan, has been the subject of many literary adaptations, in particular The Tale of Heiji (平治物語, Heiji monogatari) from which the emakimono is directly inspired. The rivalries of clans, wars, personal ambitions and political intrigue amid social change and radical policies have made the Heiji rebellion an epic subject par excellence. Indeed, this type of bloody, rhythmic storytelling is particularly suitable for emakimono.

== Description ==
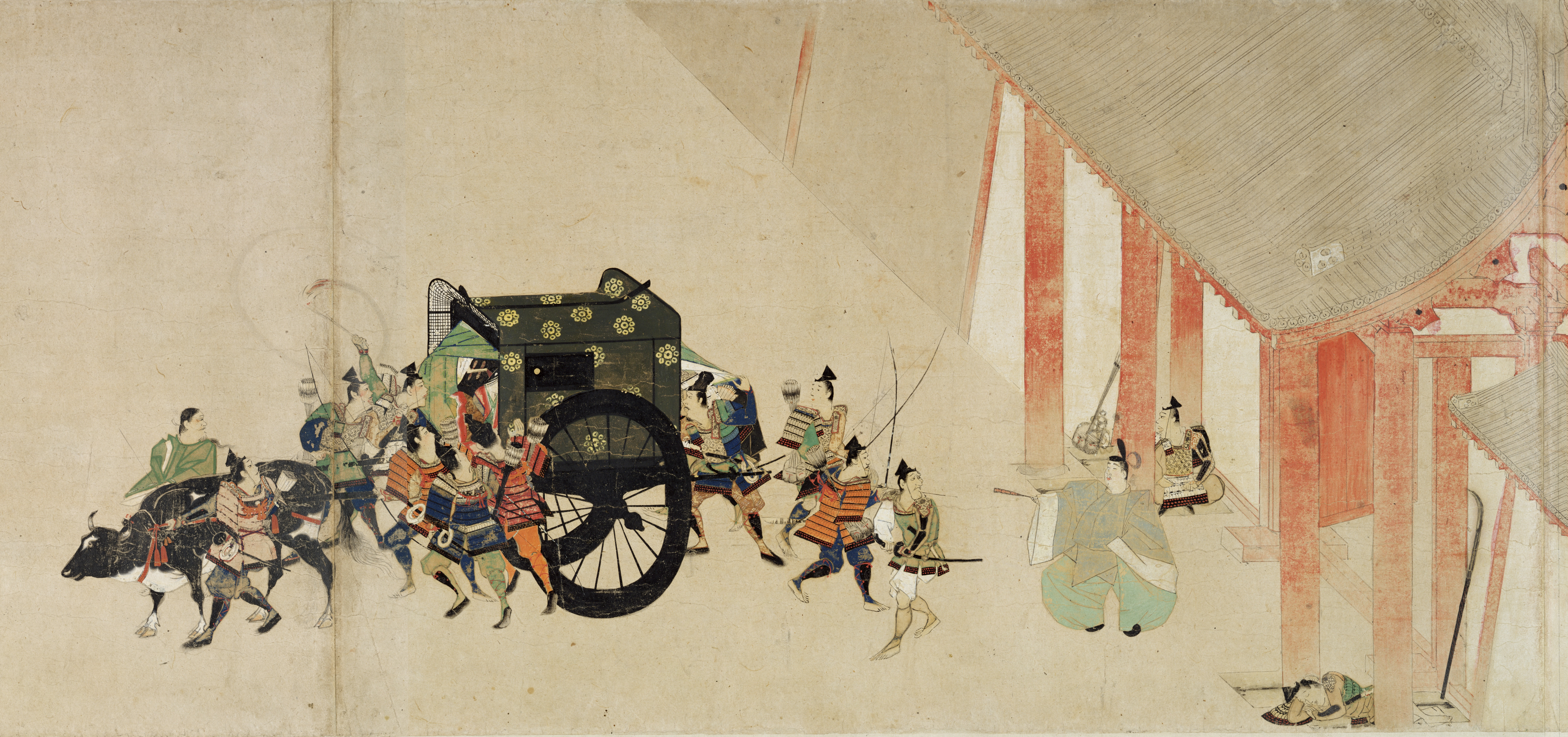
Famous scene of the escape of Emperor Nijō disguised as a woman (Emperor Nijō's flight scroll)

Today, only three scrolls of the original emakimono remain, narrating the rebellion passages corresponding to the third, fourth, fifth, sixth, thirteenth and the beginning of the fourteenth chapters in The Tale of Heiji. According to Dietrich Seckel, the original version probably had between ten and fifteen chapters, covering the thirty-six chapters of The Tale. Period fragments of a fourth scroll also exist, as well as later copies of a fifth.

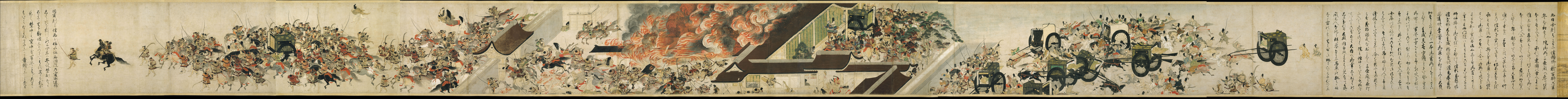
Digital scan of the Sanjō Palace fire scroll
(The frame cropping simulates the viewing portion of typical emakimono, read right to left)

The first scroll, measuring 41.2 cm (16.2 in) by 730.6 cm (287.6 in), is at the Museum of Fine Arts, Boston; two sections of texts framing a long painting are taken from the third chapter of The Tale and relate the burning of Sanjō Palace by Fujiwara no Nobuyori (an ally of the Minamoto clan) and Minamoto no Yoshitomo. The whole scene, cruel and pathetic, is built around the fire, bloody fighting around the palace, and the pursuit and arrest of Retired Emperor Go-Shirakawa. Nobles of the court, including women, were for the most part savagely killed by guns, fire or horses.

The second scroll, 42.7 cm (16.8 in) by 1,011.7 cm (398.3 in), is at the Seikadō Bunko Art Museum in Tokyo; it includes three short texts from chapters four, five and six of The Tale. The scroll opens with a Minamoto war council about Shinzei (Fujiwara no Michinori), an enemy who fled the palace. Alas, the latter commits suicide in the mountains around Kyoto and his body is found by Minamoto no Mitsuyasu's men, who behead him to bring back his head as a trophy. Clan leaders then visit Mitsuyasu's home to verify Shinzei's death and return to Kyoto showing off his head.

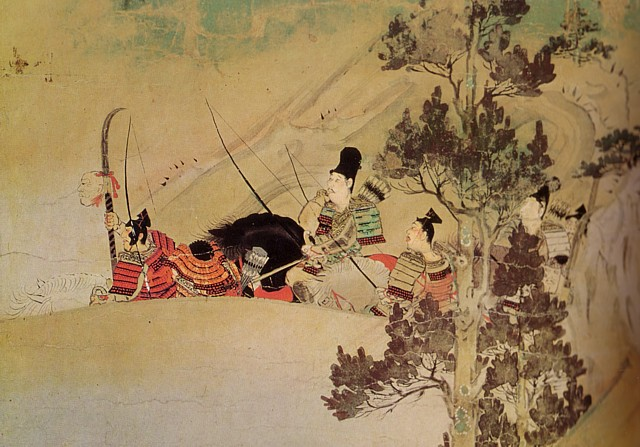
Matsuyama's men, allies of the Minamoto clan, bring back Shinzei's head as a trophy (Shinzei scroll)

The third scroll, 42.3 cm (16.7 in) by 951 cm (374 in), is kept at the Tokyo National Museum. Composed of four paintings and four portions of texts taken from chapter thirteen of The Tale, it depicts another famous moment of the Heiji rebellion: the escape of the young Emperor Nijō, disguised as a woman, followed by that of Bifukumon-in (wife of the late Emperor Toba). Under the cover of night and with the help of his followers, his escort managed to escape the Minamoto guards and to join Taira no Kiyomori in Rokuhara (his men however failed to bring back the shinkyō, or sacred mirror). The final scenes offer a view of the Taira stronghold and the splendour of their army as Nobuyori is stunned when he discovers the escape.

The fourteen fragments of the fourth scroll, scattered in various collections, are about the Battle of Rokuhara: Minamoto no Yoshitomo attacks the stronghold of the Taira, but he is defeated and must flee to the east of the country. Although the composition of this scroll is very similar to that of the other scrolls, it cannot be said with certainty that all of the fragments belong to the original work, as there are slight stylistic variations.

Several copies of the original four scrolls remain, as well as copies of a fifth, which is entirely lost: the battle of the Taiken Gate, without text, narrating the Taira's assault on the Imperial Palace where the Minamoto warriors had entrenched themselves.

The first scroll, now in Boston, depicting the burning of the Sanjō Palace, is regularly described as one of the masterpieces of Japanese emakimono art and of military painting of the world in general. The second, or Shinzei, scroll is listed in the Register of Important Cultural Property, and the third scroll, relating Emperor Nijō's flight, is included in the Register of National Treasures of Japan.

== Dating, author and sponsor ==
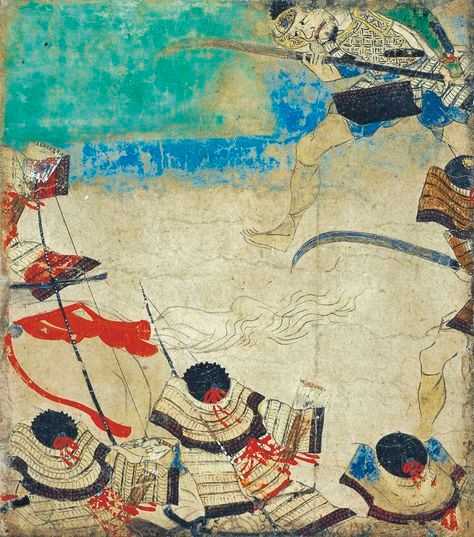
One of the surviving fragments of the Battle of Rokuhara scroll

Very little information is available about the realisation of the original scrolls, and the events explaining their condition and partial destruction. The artist(s) remain unknown; the work was previously attributed to the supposed 14th century painter Sumiyoshi Keion, but that attribution has been deprecated since the second half of the 20th century, as the very existence of that painter is doubtful.

The sponsor is no better known, but was probably a relative of the Minamoto clan, ruler of Japan at the time the emakimono was made, as suggested by the brilliant representation of the Minamoto warriors.

According to estimates and stylistic comparisons, the creation of the work dates from the middle and second half of the 13th century, probably between the 1250s and the 1280s. The pictorial proximity between all the scrolls shows that they probably come from the same workshop painters, but slight variations tend to confirm that the preparation took place over several decades during the second half of the 13th century, without the reason for such a long period of creation being known.

Fragments of the fourth or Battle of Rokuhara scroll, a little more recent and slightly different in style, may belong either to the original work or to an old copy from the Kamakura period according to art historians, but again the true position is uncertain.

== Style and composition ==
The pictorial style of the Heiji Monogatari Emaki is Yamato-e, a Japanese painting movement (as opposed to Chinese styles) that peaked during the Heian and Kamakura periods. Artists of the Yamato-e style, a colourful and decorative everyday form of art, expressed in all their subjects the sensitivity and character of the people of the Japanese archipelago.

The work belongs mainly to the otoko-e ("painting of men") genre of Yamato-e, typical of epic tales or religious legends, by emphasising the freedom of ink lines and the use of light colours leaving portions of paper bare. The dynamism of the lines is particularly evident in the crowds of people and soldiers. However, and as in the Ban Dainagon Ekotoba, it is combined with the onna-e (or "painting of women") court style of Yamato-e, especially in the choice of more vivid colours for certain details such as clothing, armour and flames. The scene of the fire is also reminiscent of that of the Ōtenmon gate in the Ban Dainagon Ekotoba, due to its similar composition. The colour in the work is applied mainly using the tsukuri-e technique characteristic of onna-e: a first sketch of the outlines is made, then the colour is added in solid form, and finally the outlines are redrawn in ink over the paint. This mixture of onna-e and otoko-e, tangible in other works such as the Kitano Tenjin Engi Emaki, is typical of the emakimono style from the beginning of the Kamakura period, with rich colours using bright pigments alongside more pastel shades, while the lines remain dynamic and expressive, but less free than in older otoko-e paintings. The military in power at the time particularly appreciated colourful and dynamic historical and military chronicles.

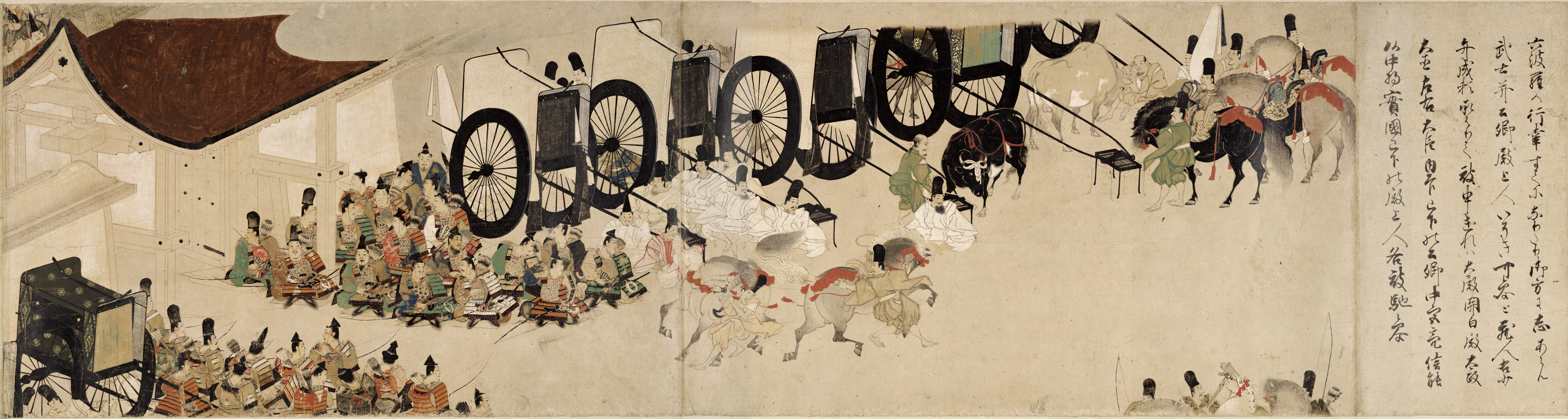
Emperor Nijō's festive arrival at the Tairas' residence in Rokuhara, after his escape; the styling is very clean and realistic, except for the richly rendered clothes (Emperor Nijō's flight scroll)

A new desire for realism, notable in several aspects of the Heiji Monogatari Emaki, also marked the art of portrayal of Kamakura warriors: in this work, the combat scenes are expressed in a raw and brutal way, showing the suffering and death in the glowing flames and blood. In particular, the painting of the attack on the Sanjō Palace depicts soldiers slaughtering aristocrats and displaying their heads on top of lances. Christine Shimizu underlines the realism in the representation of the characters: "The painter approaches the faces, the attitudes of the characters as well as the movements of the horses with a surprising sense of realism, proving his ability to incorporate the techniques of nise-e in complex scenes" (nise-e was a realistic style of portraiture in vogue at the time). The realistic tendency is also found in most of the alternative versions of the work. On the other hand, the sets are most often minimalist to keep the reader's attention on the action and the suspense, without distraction.

The emakimono is also distinguished by two types of classical emakimono arts composition techniques. On the one hand, continuous compositions make it possible to represent several scenes or events in the same painting, without a precise border, in order to favour a fluid pictorial narration; this is the case with the first or Sanjō Palace fire scroll and the fourth or Battle of Rokuhara scroll. On the other hand, the alternating compositions bring together calligraphy and illustrations, the paintings then aiming to capture particular moments of the story; this is the case with the other scrolls as well as the copies of the now lost Battle of Taiken Gate scroll. The painter thus manages to vary with accuracy the rhythm of the narration throughout the emakimono, for example making passages of strong tensions succeed more peaceful scenes, such as the arrival of Emperor Nijō among the Taira after his perilous flight.

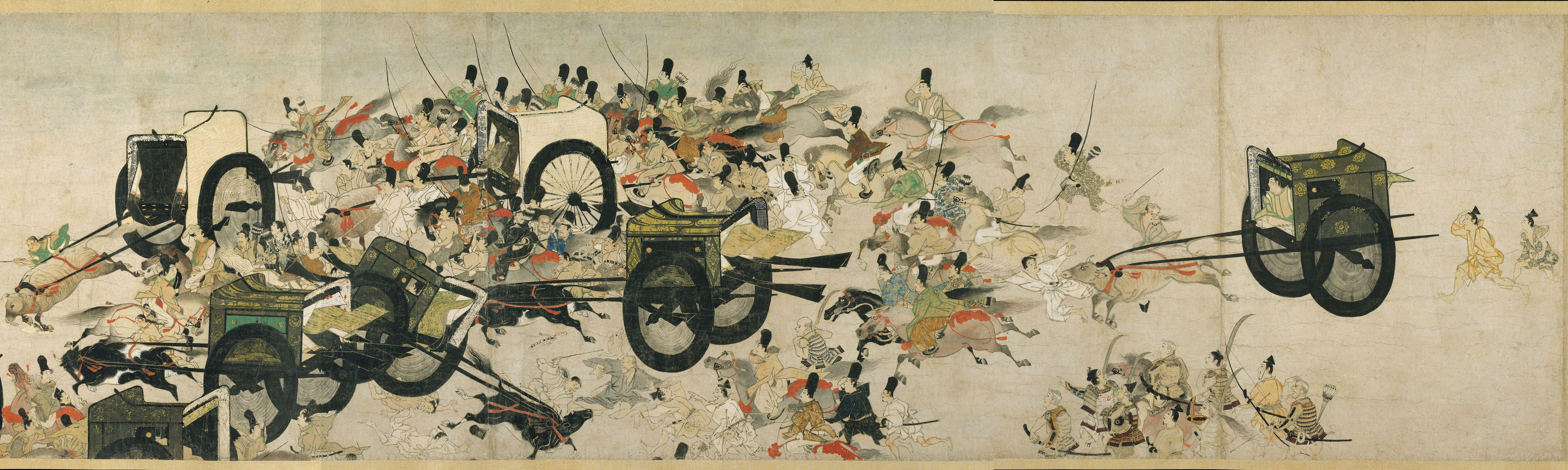
A scene from the Heiji Monogatari Emaki showing several gissha (牛車, bullock cart) with mon fleeing a battle; the mon with nine circles is called kuyō-mon, representing the sun, moon, Mercury, Venus, Mars, Jupiter, Saturn, and two imaginary stars, and was believed to ward off evil. The mon of cranes represented good fortune, longevity, and prosperity of the descendants.

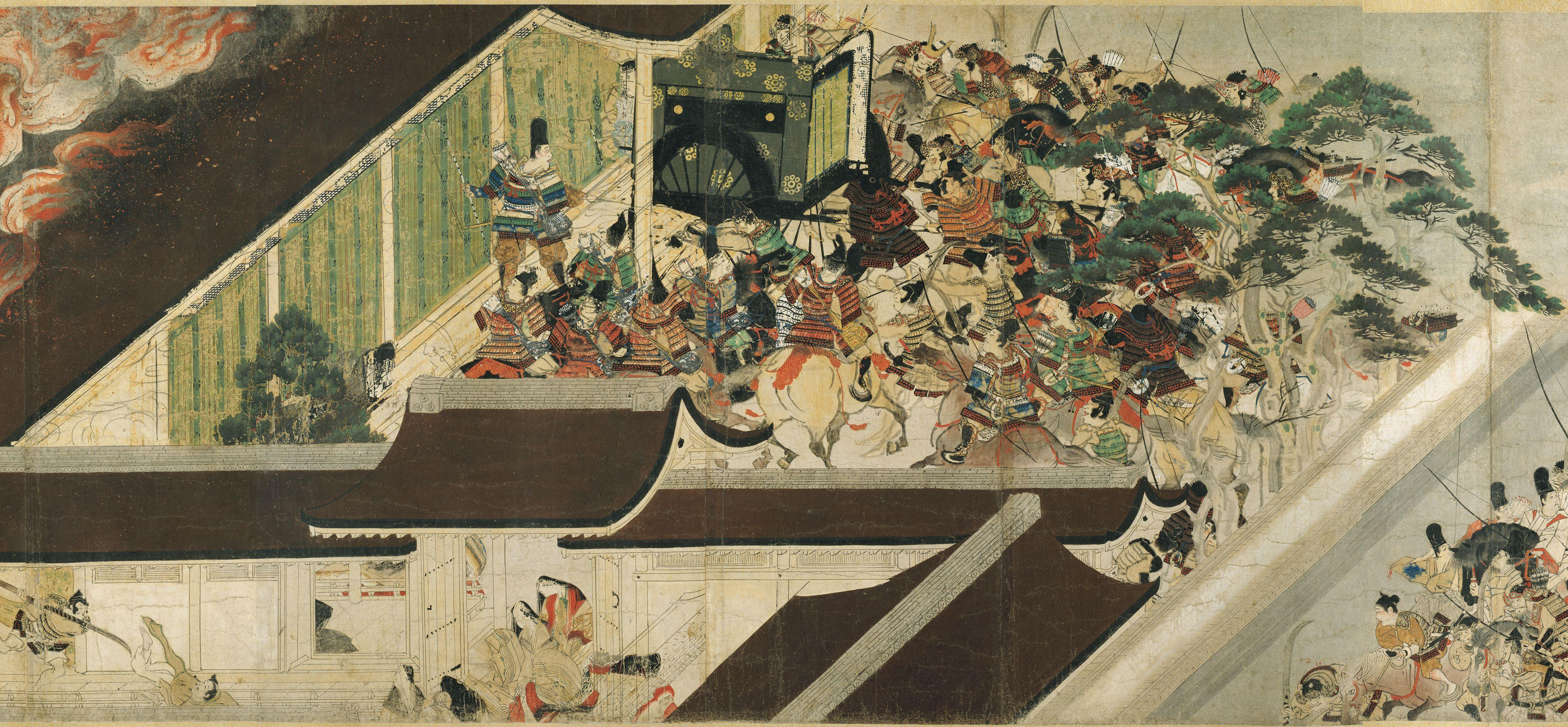
Minamoto warriors prepare to storm the Sanjō Palace: the warrior standing in bluish-coloured armour is Fujiwara no Nobuyori – the wall provides a transition to the fire, which points to the top left, and the scenes of massacres at the bottom (Sanjō Palace fire scroll)

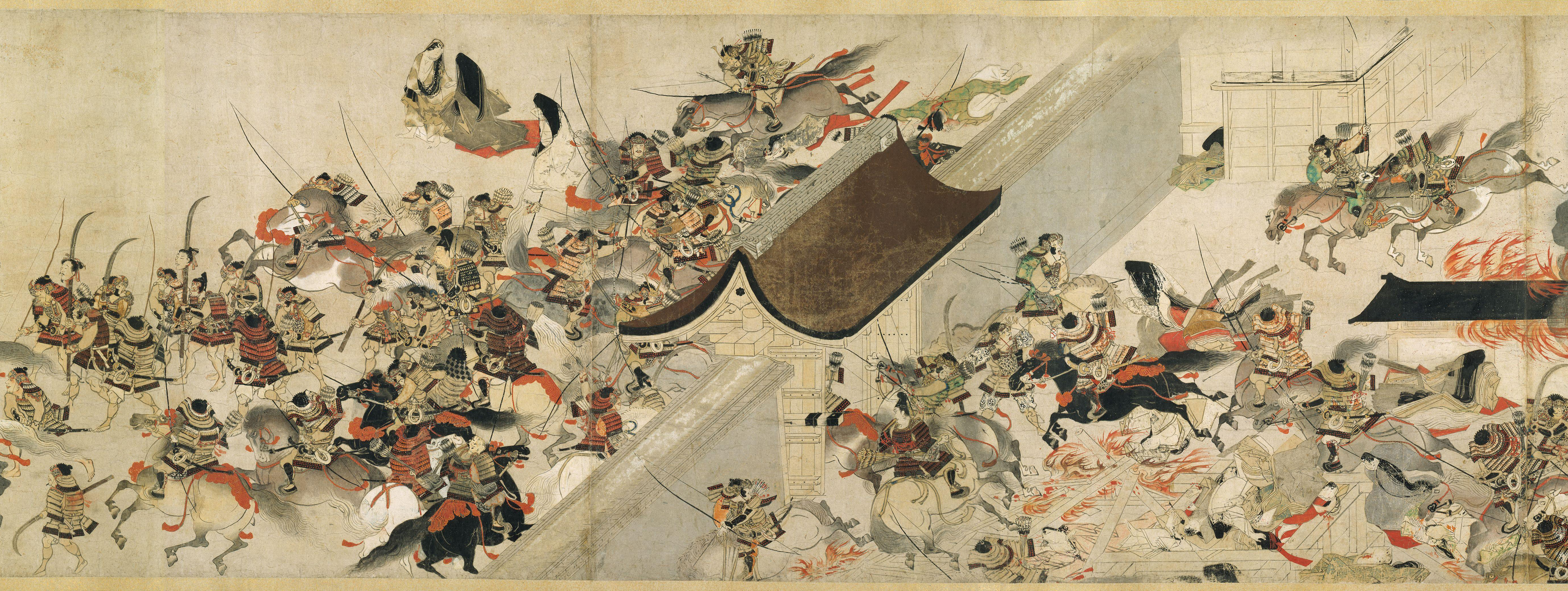
Bloody battle with a characteristic dynamic style: in particular, on the right, the corpses of nobles are piled up, at the top, women are trying to escape, and on the left, soldiers are proudly displaying the heads of enemies on their spears (Sanjō Palace fire scroll)

The long painted sequences with continuous compositions, sometimes interspersed with short calligraphy, make possible the intensification of the painting to its dramatic climax, in the remarkable scene of the fire at the Sanjō Palace: the reader first discovers the flight of the Emperor's troops, then more and more violent fighting leading up to the confusion around the fire – the summit of the composition where the density of the characters only fades in front of the ample volutes of smoke – and then finally the scene calms down with the encirclement of the Emperor's chariot and a soldier who moves away peacefully towards the left. The transition to the scene of the fire is effected by means of a wall of the Palace, which divides the emakimono by long diagonals over almost its entire height, creating an effect of suspense and different narrative spaces with great fluidity. For art historians, the mastery of composition and rhythm, evident in continuous paintings, as well as the care given to colours and lines, make this scroll one of the most admirable to have survived from the Kamakura period.

The emakimono also displays some innovations of composition for the groups of characters, by arranging them in triangles or rhombuses. This approach makes it possible to take advantage of the reduced height of the scrolls to represent battles by interweaving geometric shapes according to the needs of the artist.

== Historiographical value ==
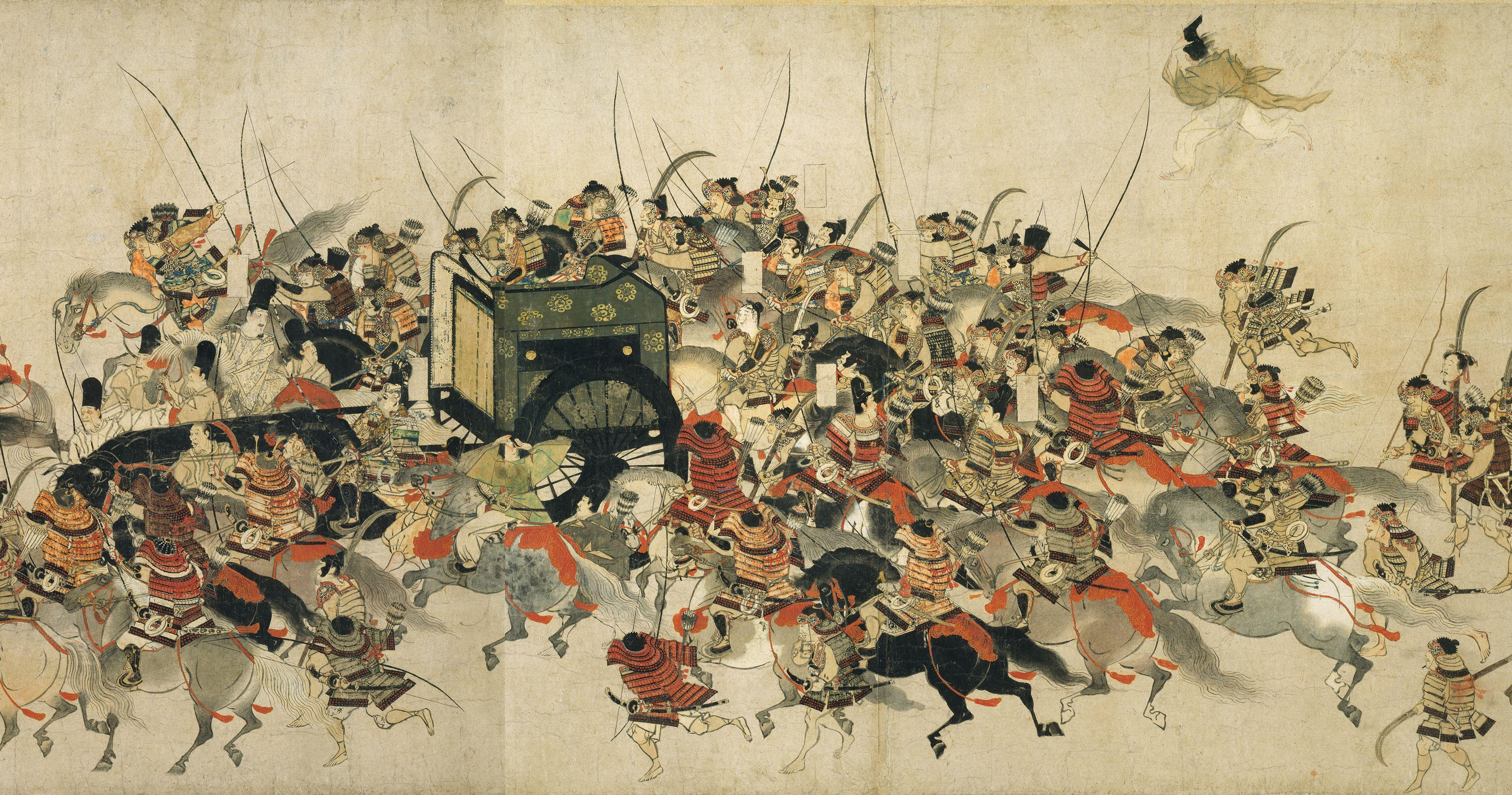
Close-up of the detailed weapons and armour of the warriors; the red-armoured horseman in the top right is none other than Minamoto no Yoshitomo (Sanjō Palace fire scroll)

The Heiji Monogatari Emaki provides a glimpse into the unfolding of historical events of the Heiji rebellion, and, more importantly, significant testimony as to the life and culture of the samurai. The first or Sanjō Palace fire scroll shows a wide range of this military class: clan chiefs, horse archers, infantry, monk-soldiers, imperial police (kebiishi) ... The weapons and armour depicted in the emakimono are also very realistic, and as a whole the work testifies to the still predominant role of the mounted yumi archer, and not the katana infantryman, for the samurai of the 12th century. The beauty of the luxurious harnesses of the Heian period is also underlined by the work; the contrast between the harnesses and the cruel and vulgar squadron is interesting, in particular because the texts in the work deal very little with this subject. Additionally, some aspects of period military uniforms can only be understood today through the paintings. On the other hand, the texts provide little historiographical information because of their brevity and, sometimes, their inadequate or inaccurate descriptions of the paintings.

The depiction of Sanjō Palace shortly before its destruction provides an important example of the ancient shinden-zukuri architectural style that developed in the Heian period away from the Chinese influences in vogue during the Nara period. The long corridors of the Palace lined with panels, windows or blinds, the raised wooden verandas and the roofs covered with thin layers of Japanese cypress bark (桧 皮 葺, hiwada-buki) are characteristic of the style.

The emakimono has also been a source of inspiration for various artists, first and foremost those who took up the theme of the Heiji rebellion on a screen or fan, including Tawaraya Sōtatsu and Iwasa Matabei. In paintings of a major military subject in Japan, many depictions of battle are unsurprisingly inspired by the work. So, for example, the Taiheiki Emaki of the Edo period depicts very similar arrangements of groups of warriors and postures of the characters. Additionally, studies indicate that the painter Kanō Tan'yū was inspired, among other things, by the Heiji Monogatari Emaki in creating the paintings of the Battle of Sekigahara in his Tōshō Daigongen Engi (17th century) (according to Karen Gerhart, the goal was symbolically to associate the Tokugawa shogunate with the Minamoto clan, the first shoguns of Japan). Similar comments apply to Tani Bunchō in relation to the Ishiyama-dera Engi Emaki. Indeed, the fourth or Battle of Rokuhara scroll was the most imitated and popular in Japanese painting, so much so that in the Edo period it became a classic motif of battle paintings. Finally, Teinosuke Kinugasa drew some inspiration from the work for his film Gate of Hell (Jigokumon).

== Provenance ==
The whole of the original Heiji Monogatari Emaki was kept for a long time at the Enryaku-ji on Mount Hiei, overlooking Kyoto, together with the emakimono, no longer extant, of The Tale of Hōgen. During the 15th and the 16th centuries, the original scrolls were separated, but their history at that time is lost to modern times. In the 19th century, the Museum of Fine Arts, Boston, won the first or Sanjō Palace fire scroll through Okakura Kakuzō. The third or Flight to Rokuhara Scroll was acquired by the Tokyo National Museum from the Matsudaira clan in around 1926. Finally, the second or Shinzei scroll was acquired by the wealthy Iwasaki family, whose collection is preserved by the Seikadō Foundation (now the Seikadō Bunko Art Museum).

== Gallery ==
Heiji Monogatari Emaki - Sanjo scroll

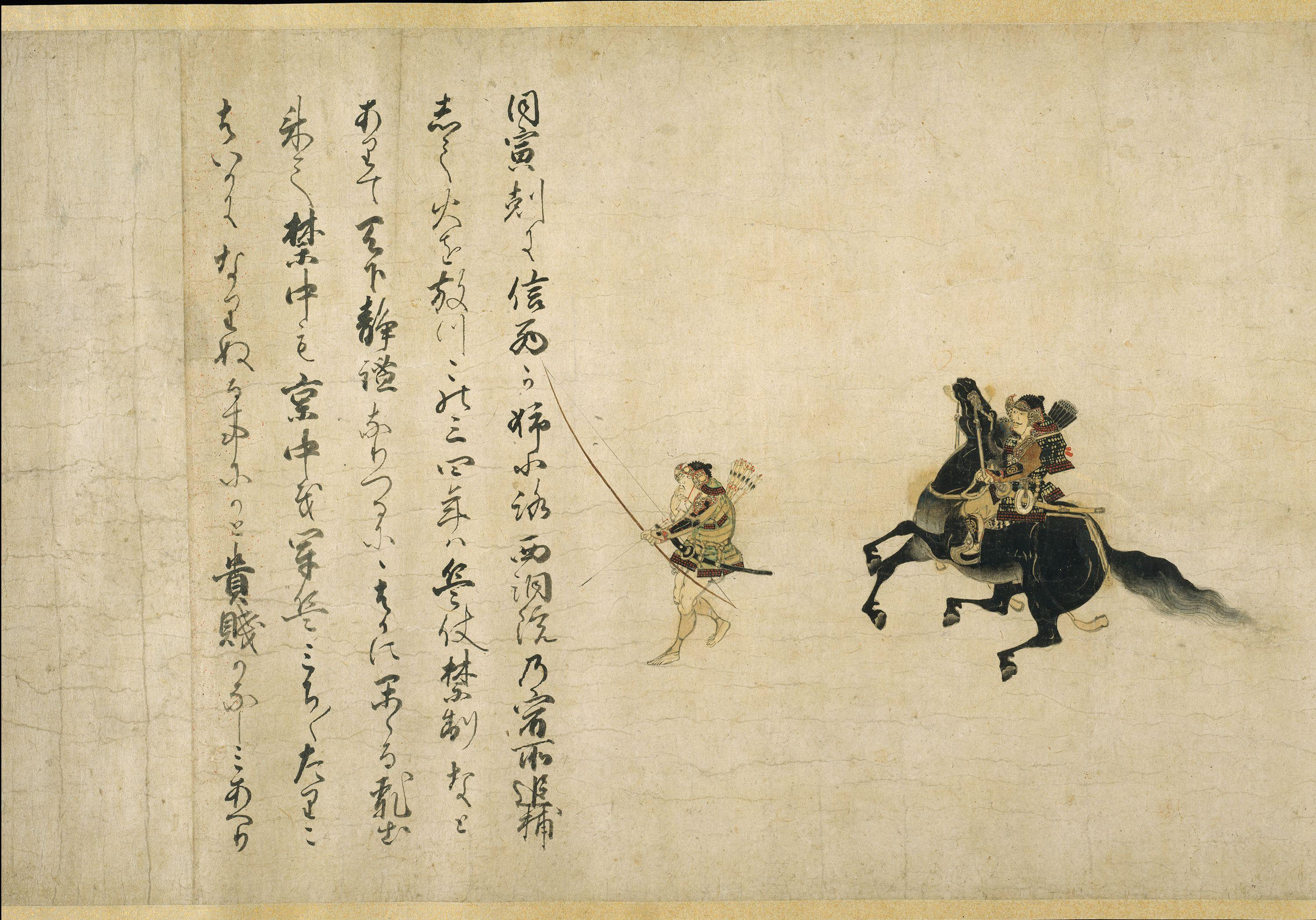

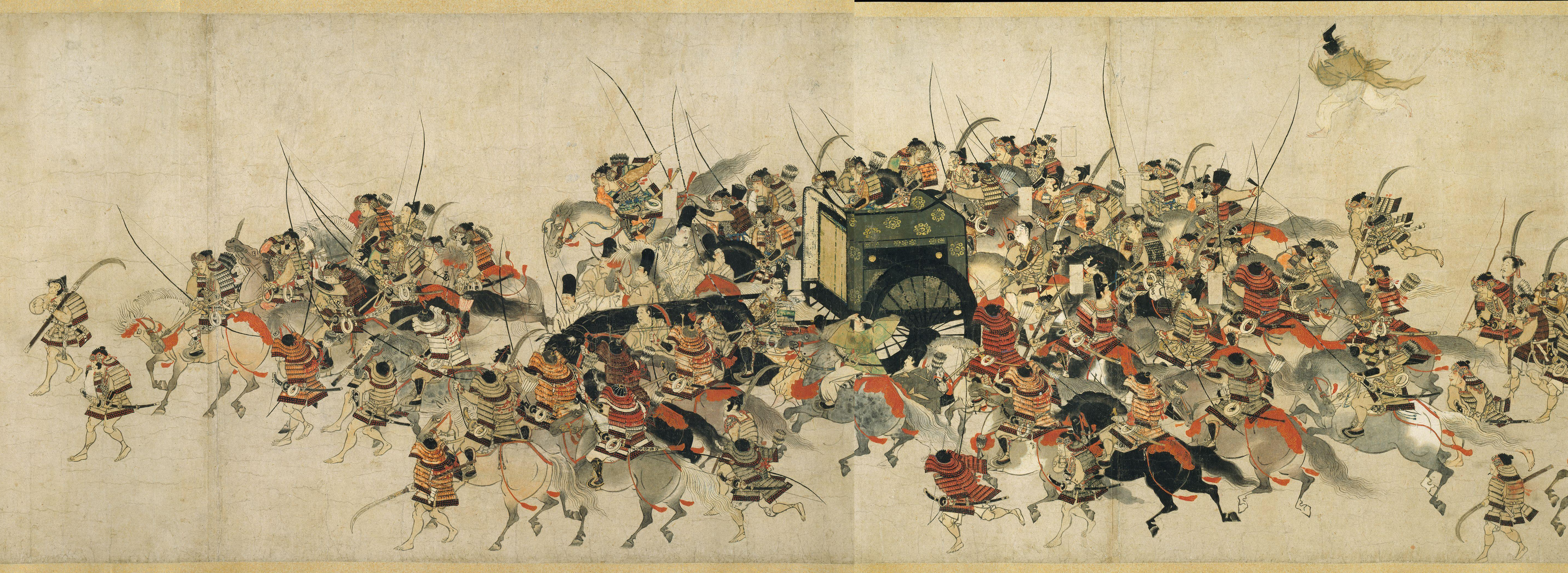

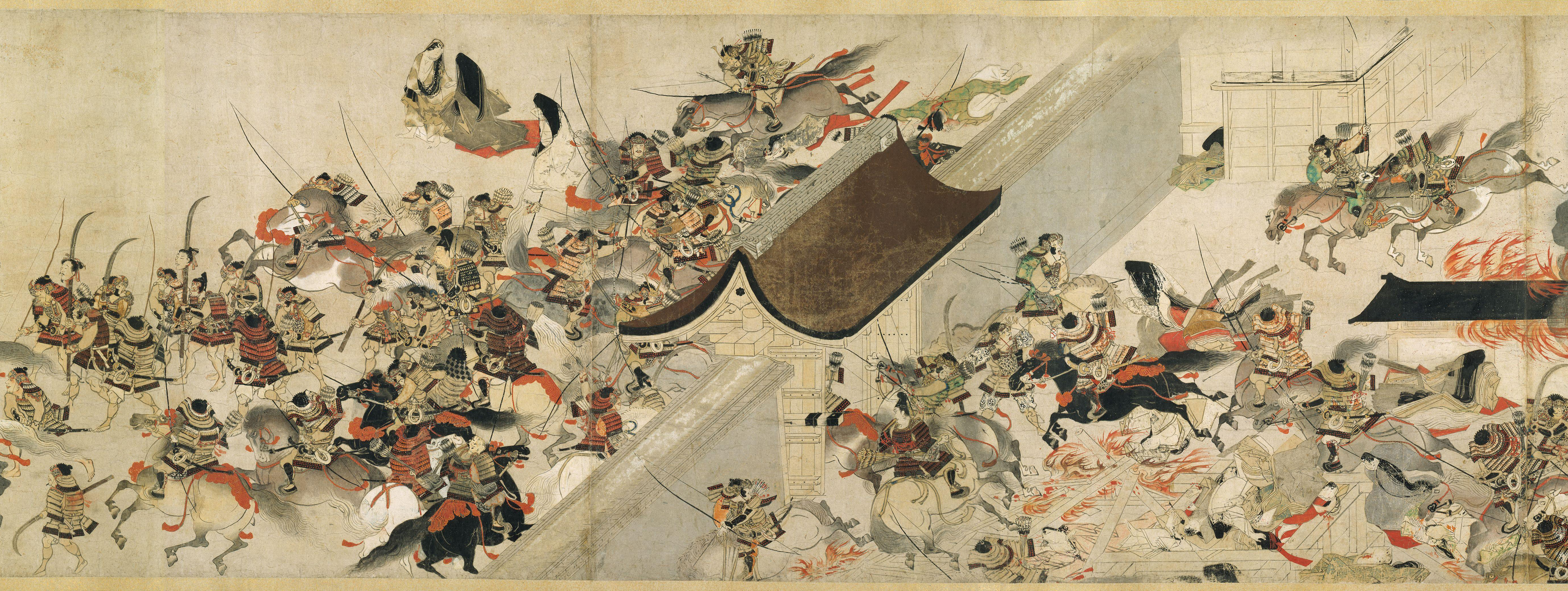

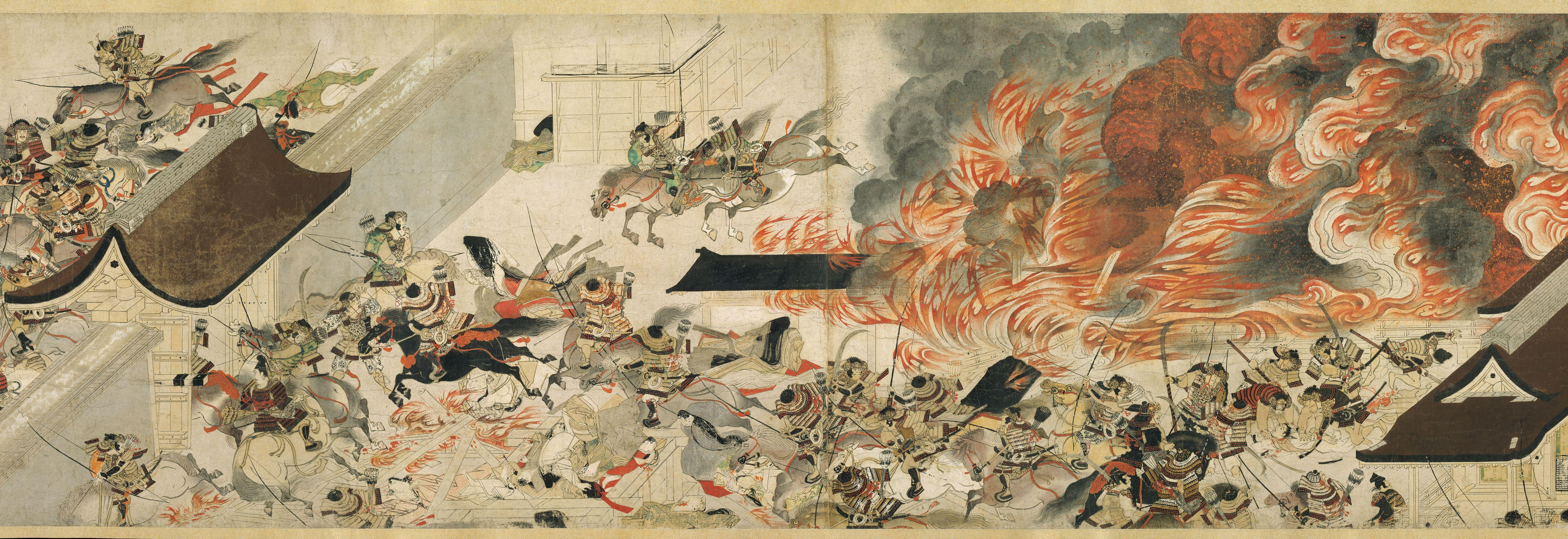

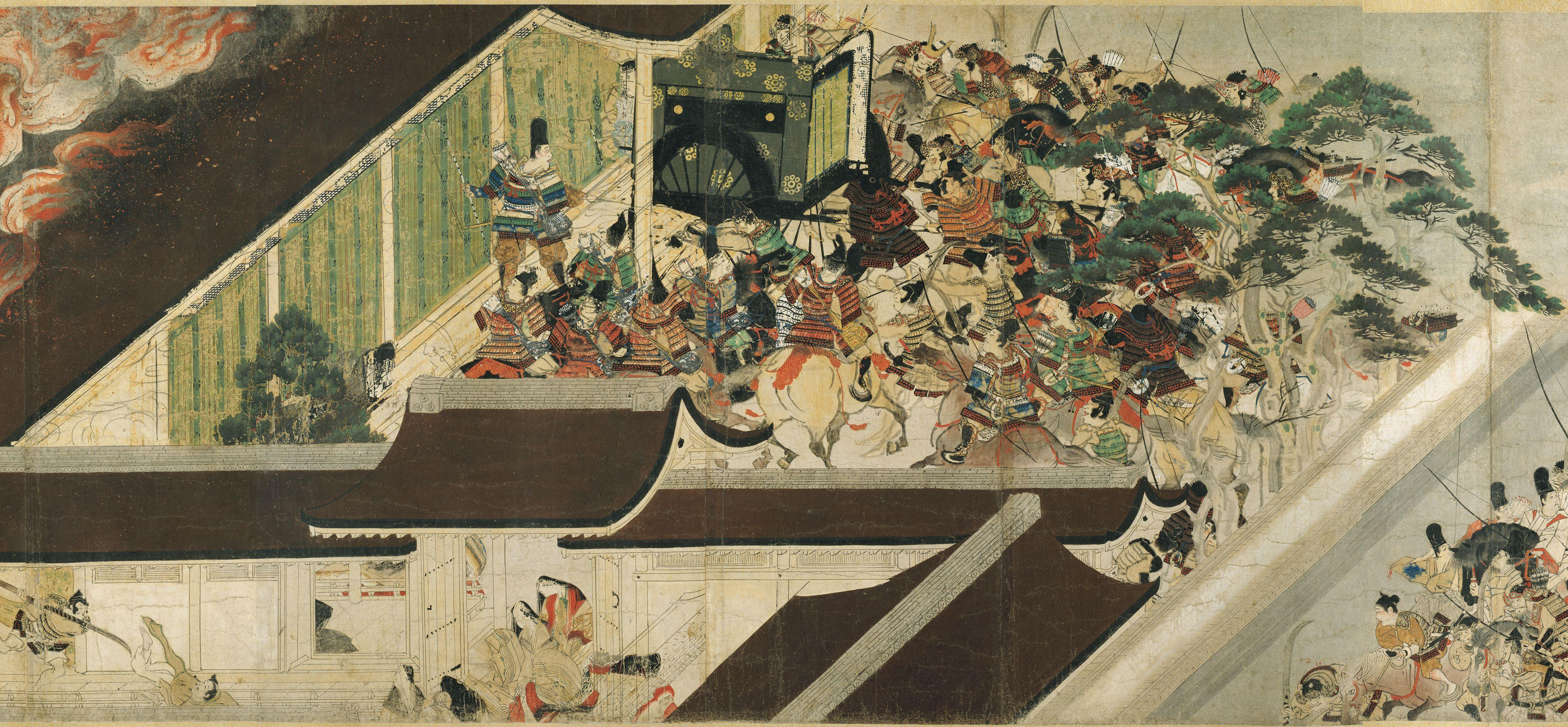

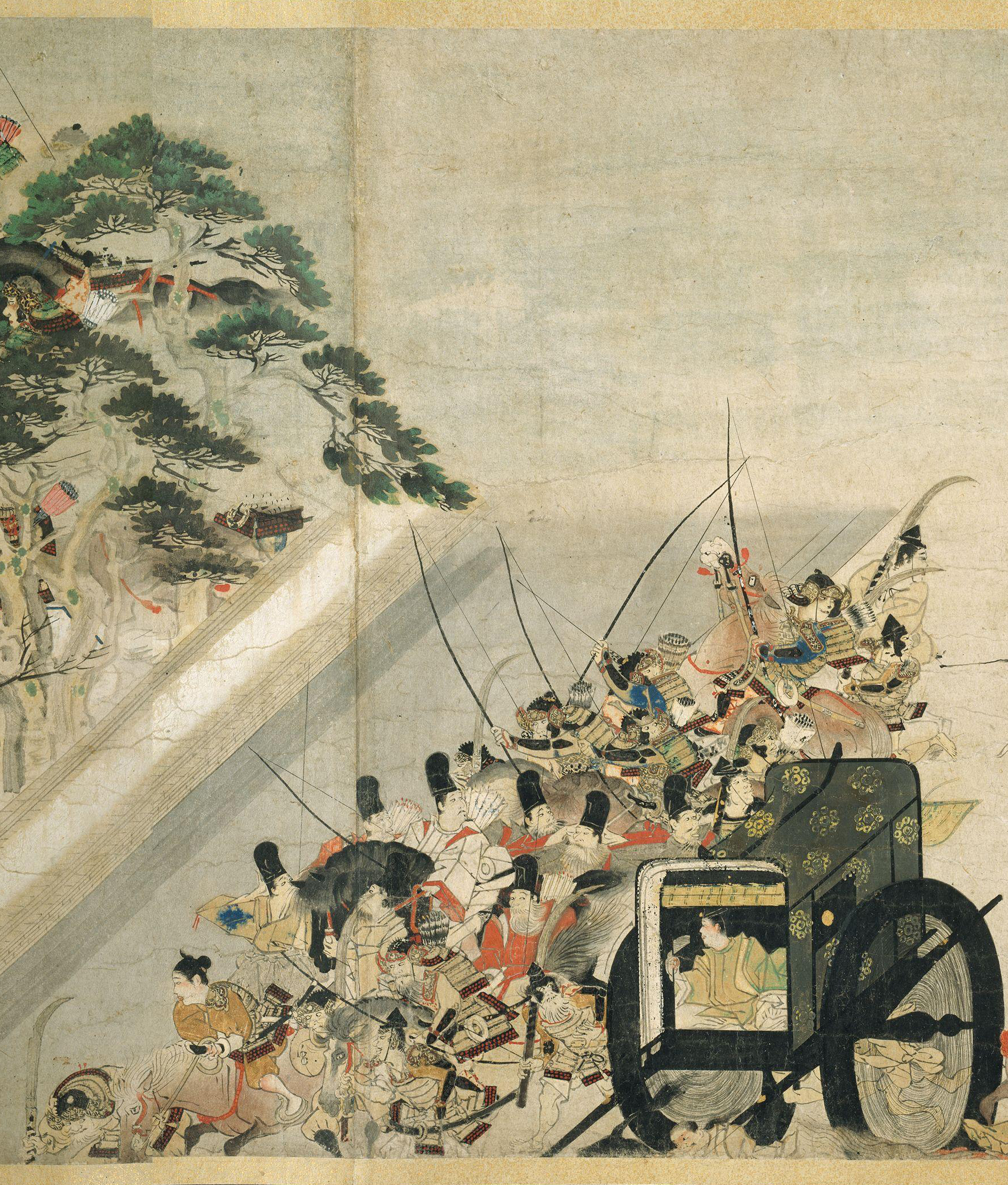

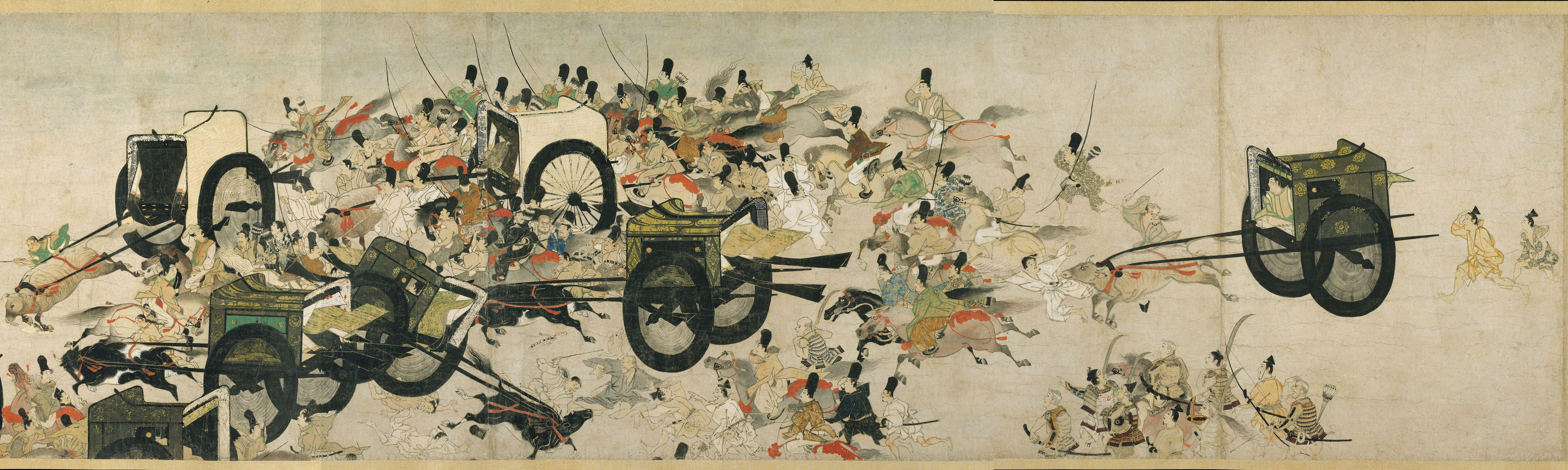

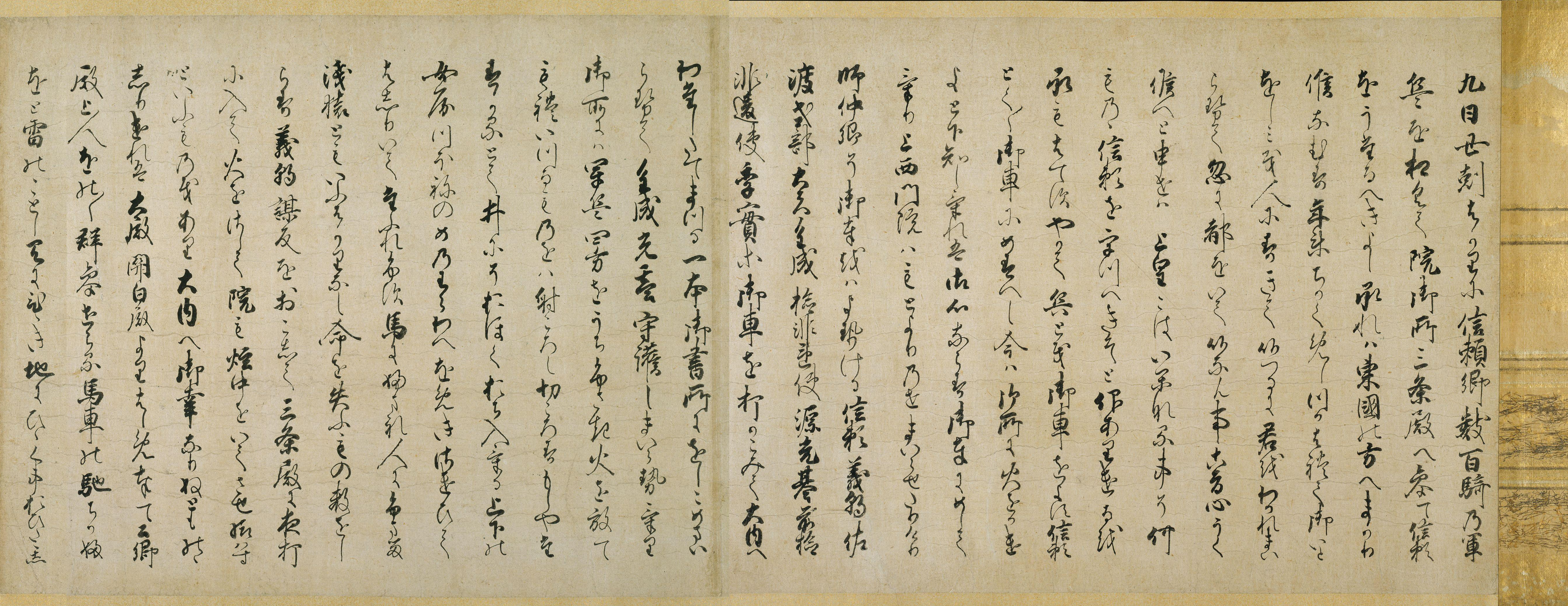

Heiji Monogatari Emaki - Shinzei Scroll

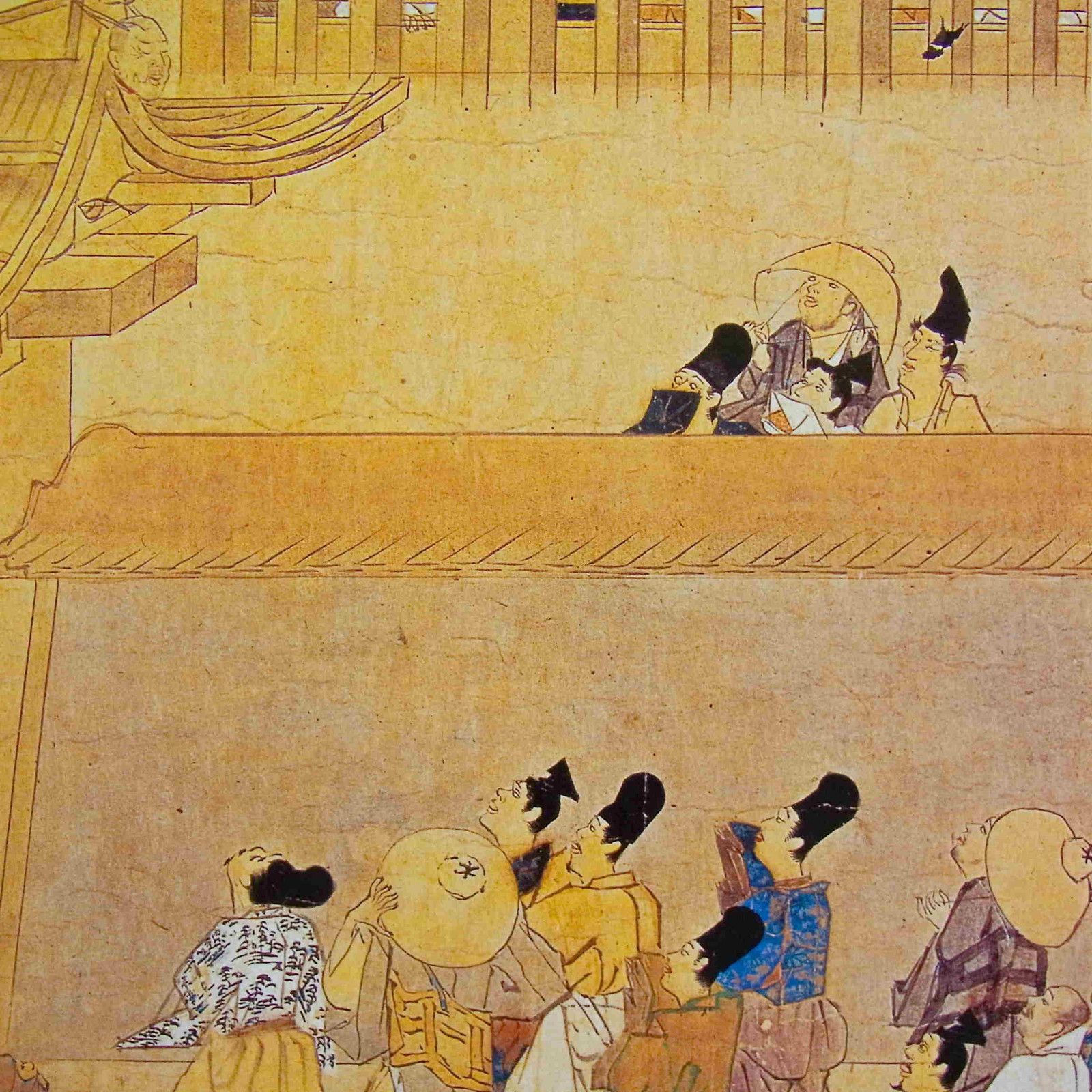

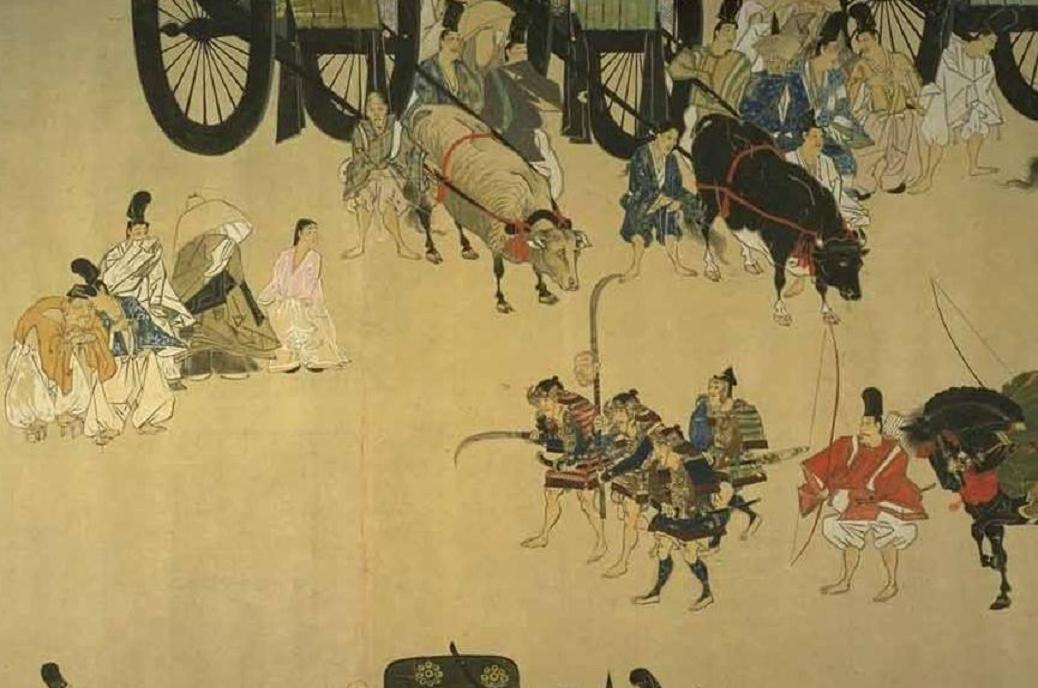

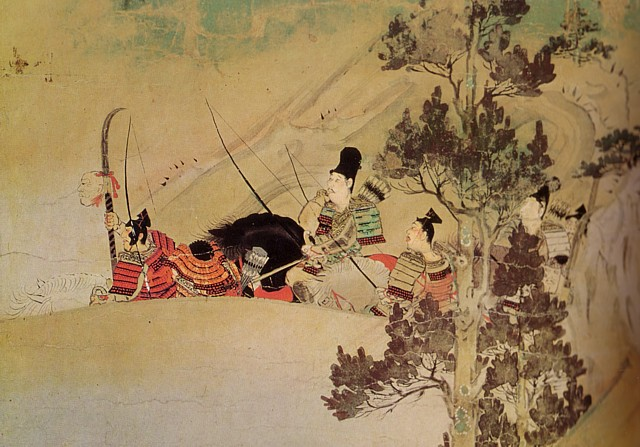

Heiji Monogatari Emaki - Rokuhara scroll

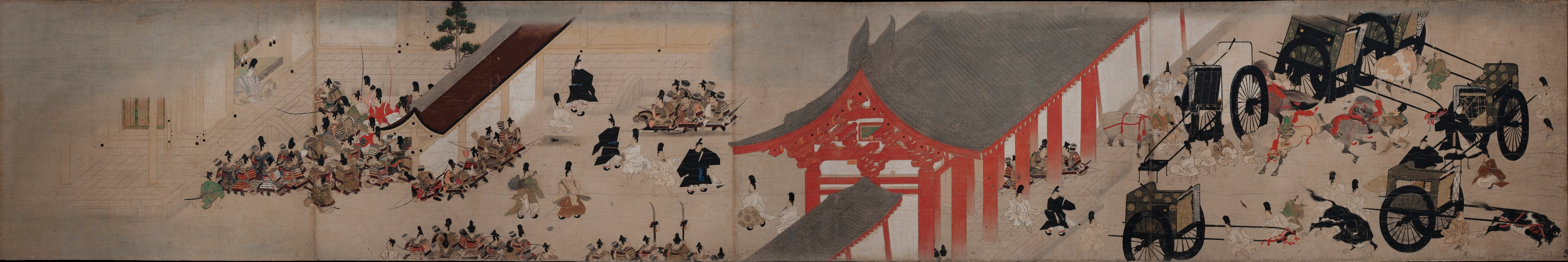

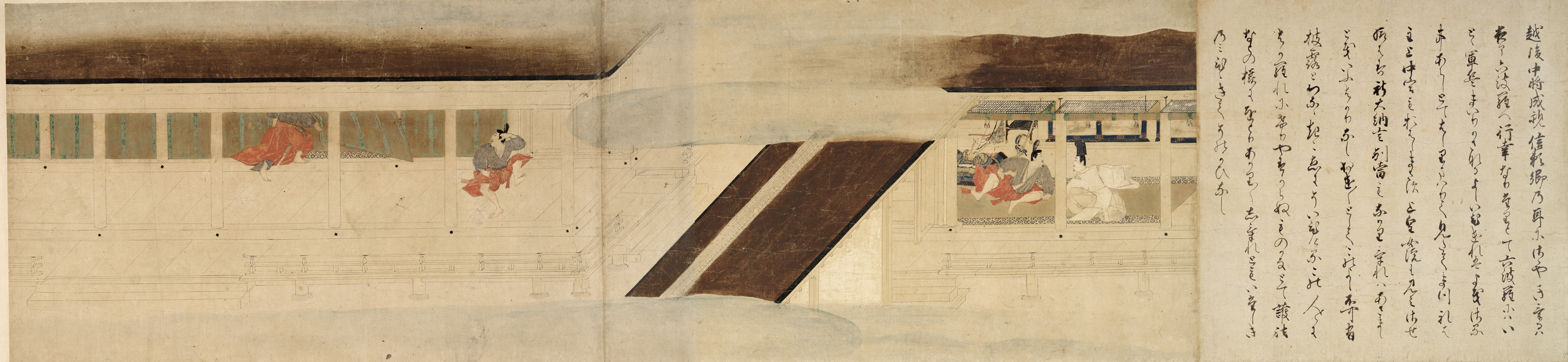

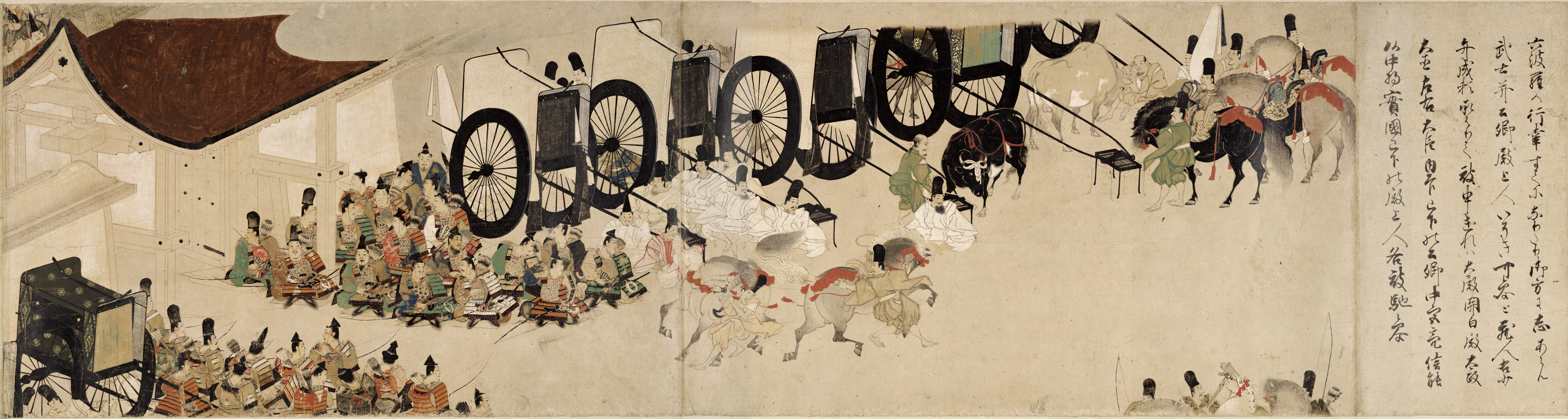

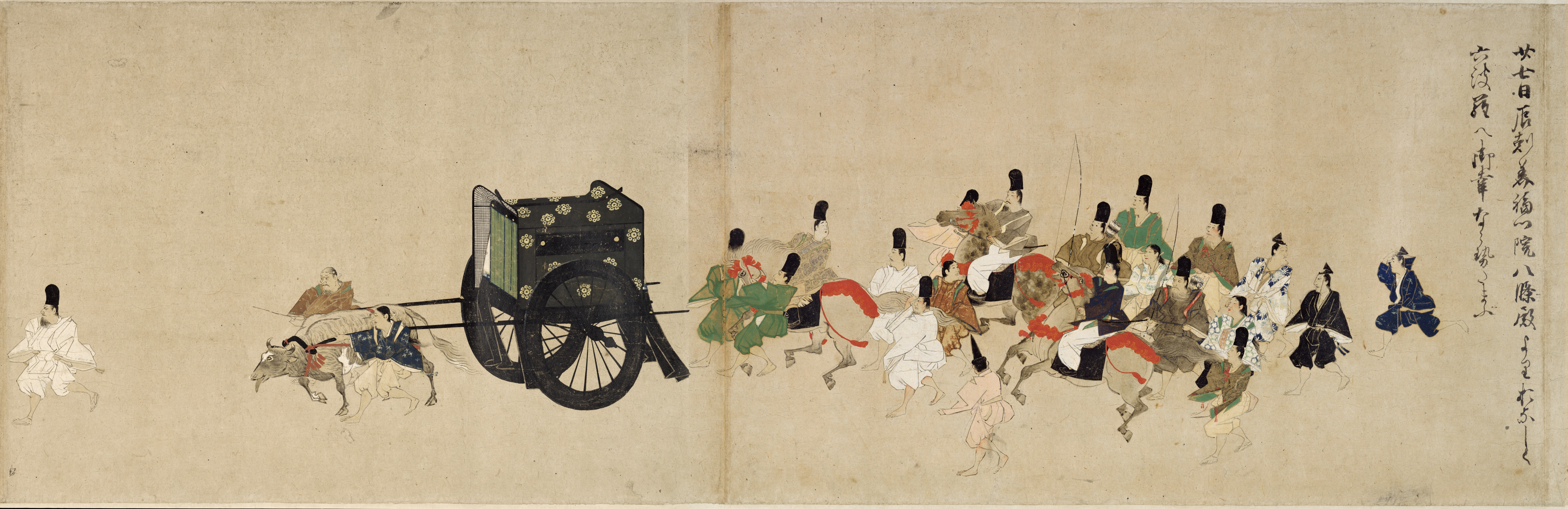

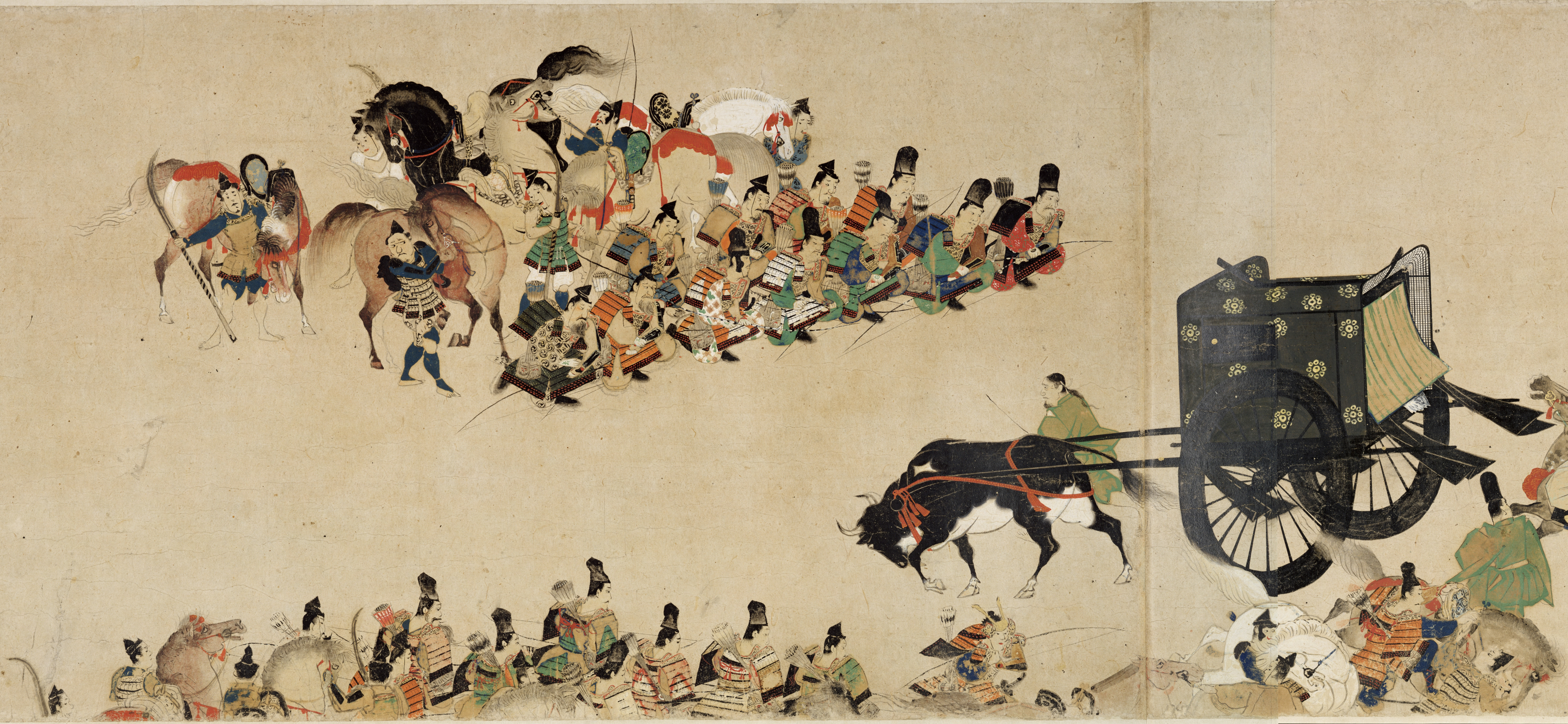

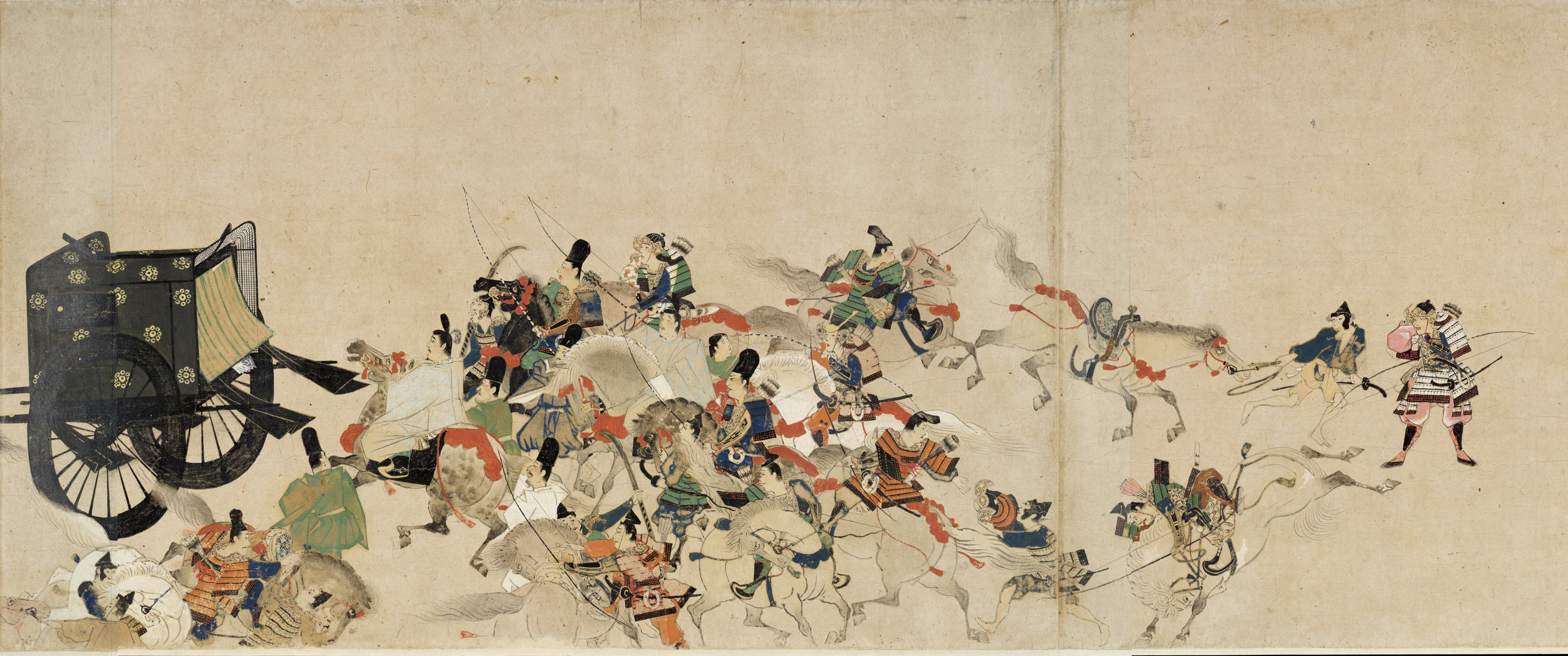

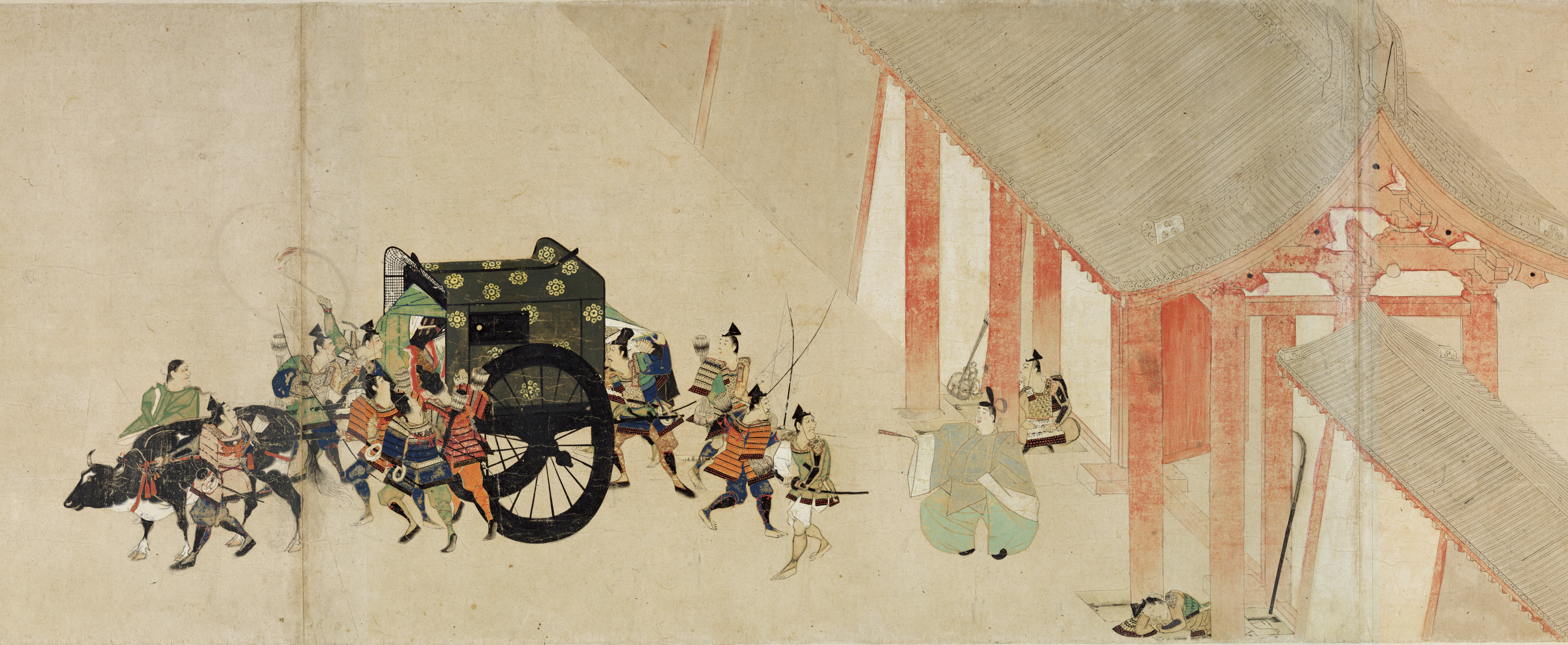

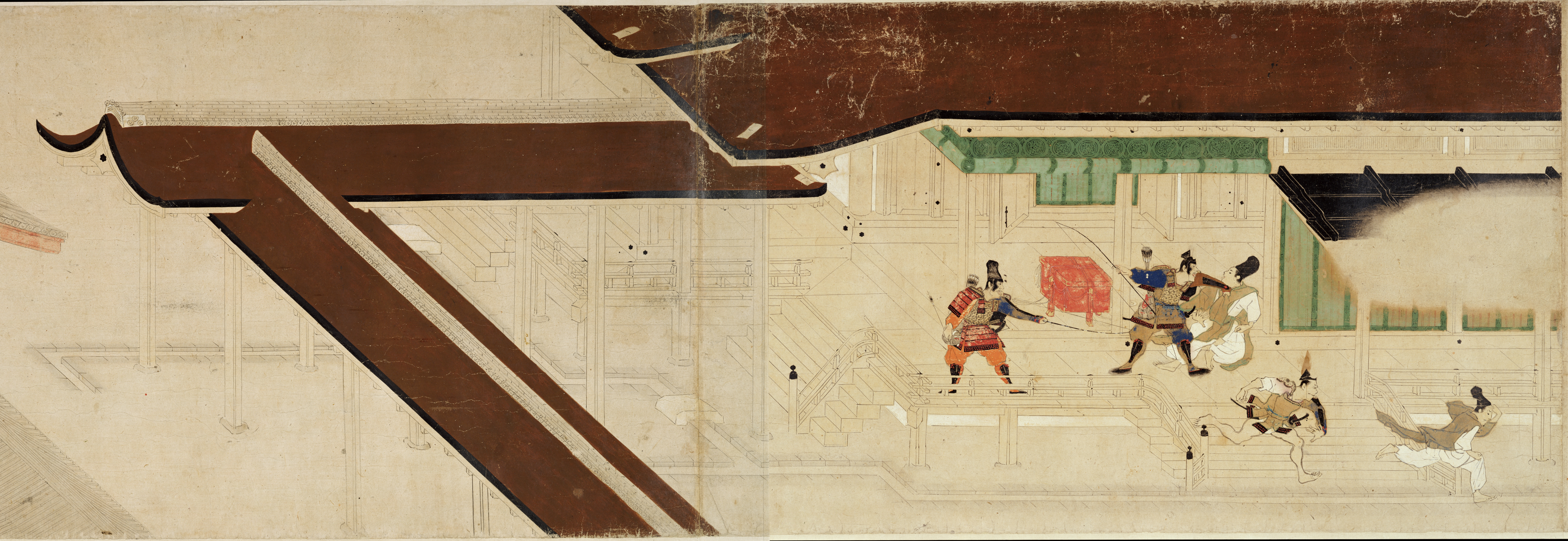

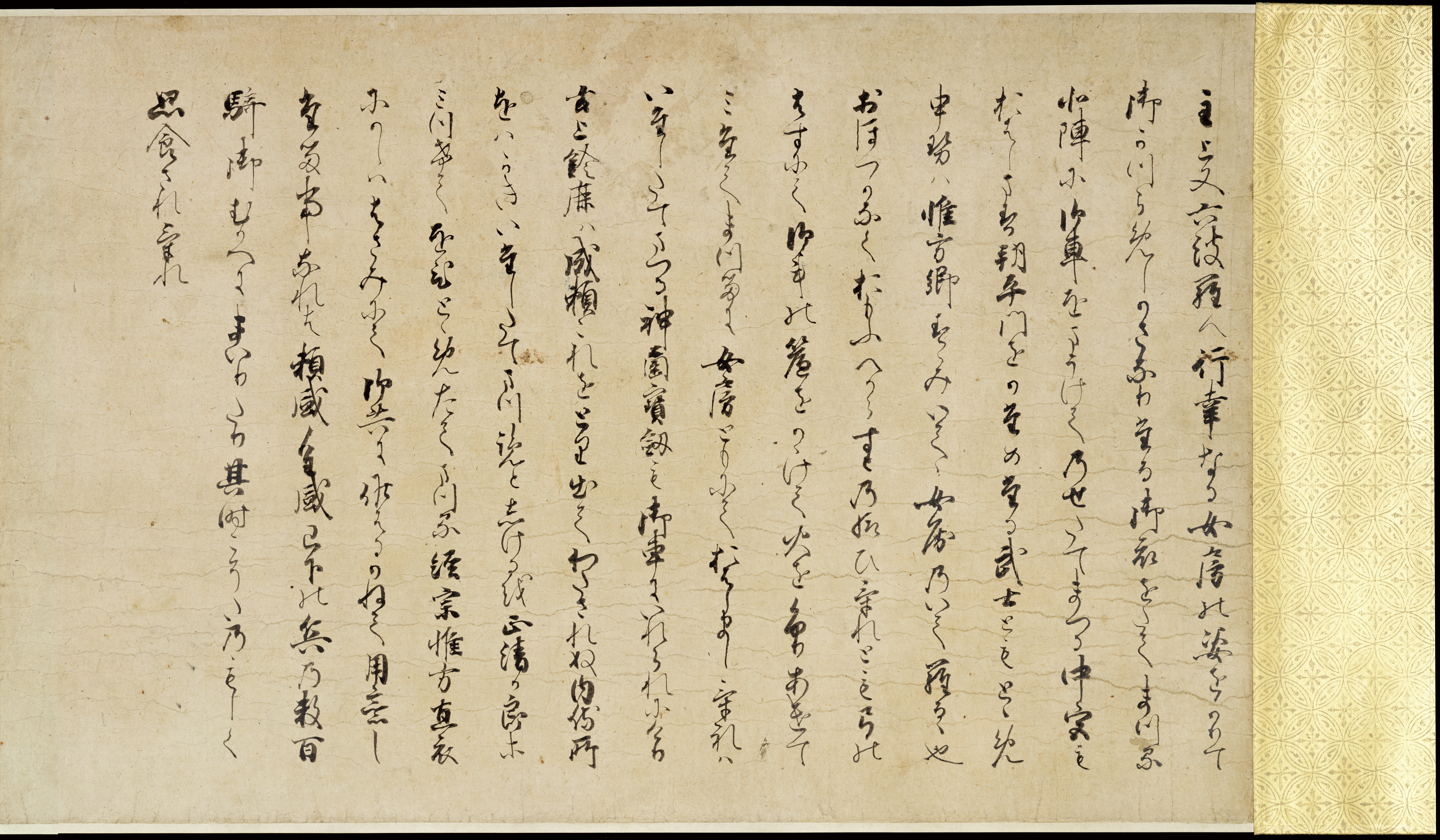

== See also ==
- List of National Treasures of Japan (paintings)
- National Treasure (Japan)
