= Daisen-in =

Sub-temple of Daitoku-ji, Kyoto, Japan

Coordinates: 35°02′40″N 135°44′45″E

Daisen-in (大仙院)
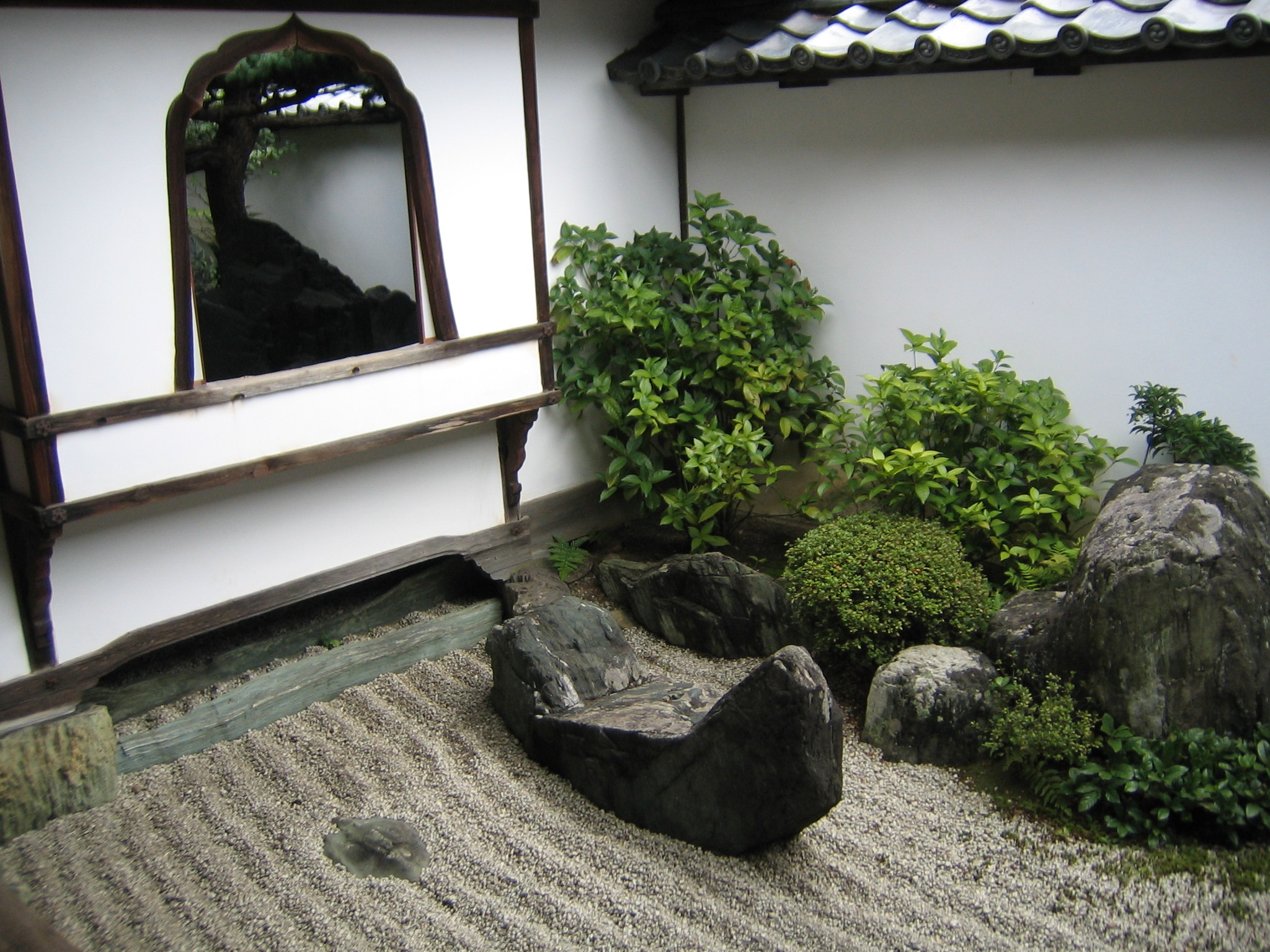
- Boat-shaped stone in the gravel "river" of Daisen-in

Religion
- Affiliation: Zen, Rinzai sect

Location
- Location: Kyoto, Kyoto Prefecture
- Country: Japan
- Interactive map of Daisen-in (大仙院)

The Daisen-in (大仙院) is a sub-temple of Daitoku-ji, a temple of the Rinzai school of Zen in Buddhism, one of the five most important Zen temples of Kyoto. The name means "The Academy of the Great Immortals." Daisen-in was founded by the Zen priest Kogaku Sōkō (古岳宗亘; 1464–1548), and was built between 1509 and 1513. The Daisen-in is noted for its screen paintings and for its kare-sansui, or dry landscape garden.

The screen paintings inside the temple and the garden are attributed to Sōami (d. 1525), a Zen monk, ink painter and follower of the sect of the Amida Buddha. He was particularly known for his use of diluted ink to create delicate and nuanced, misty and ethereal landscapes. His work was influenced by the ink landscape paintings of the Song dynasty in China. According to art historian Miyeko Murase, the work of Soami represents "the very essence of the serenity of nature, the sacred ideal of all the zen monks and ink painters of the Muromachi period".

== Rock garden ==
Despite later interpretations on the creation of the Daisen-in's rock garden, its creation was not primarily related to religious Zen: it is a good example of a Chinese style landscape, done as painting in three dimensions. Although the garden is attributed to monk-painter Soami, there is no written evidence that he was also a gardener. Wybe Kuitert suggests that the name "Soami" may have been used as a euphemism for garden makers who were of the untouchable kawaramono class and not versed in Buddhism.

The main garden, in an "L" shape, is to the northeast of and facing the shoin, the study of the hojo, the residence of the head of the monastery. This part of the garden is a narrow strip just 3.7 metres (12 ft) wide. It contains a miniature landscape similar to a Song dynasty landscape painting, composed of rocks suggesting mountains and a waterfall, clipped shrubs and trees representing a forest, and raked white gravel representing a river. The "river" splits into branches, one of which flows into a "Middle Sea" of raked white gravel and a few rocks; the other flows through a gate to a larger "Ocean" of white gravel. In the river are several symbolic stones; one resembles a boat moving with the current, and the other resembles the back of a turtle trying to swim upstream. The "Ocean" has two cone-shaped hills of gravel, suggesting mountains. The "Middle Sea" and The "Ocean" are connected by another passage of white gravel west of the building. The "Ocean" and the "Middle Sea" are both believed to be later additions to the original garden.

American garden historians David and Michigo Young suggest that the garden may represent a metaphorical journey through life: the waterfall/river/sea may represent youth, maturity, and old age, or the search for wisdom. The rocks in the "rivers" may suggest obstacles. The "Ocean" at the end of the voyage may be the return to the eternal at the end of life.

French author Danielle Elisseeff sees the garden as divided into four spaces representing four themes; the first is the waterfall, or the impetuous beginning life; the second is the gate, symbolizing the passages of life. This theme features the stone "turtle" struggling upstream against the current, and the "treasure boat" moving downstream with the current: the third is the "Middle Sea"; and the fourth is the "Ocean", the final destination of calm and serenity.

German author Gunter Nitschke gives a similar explanation. He writes that the garden is "the life of man in symbolic form." The mountain at the beginning of the garden is Mount Horai, the traditional meeting place of the Eight Immortals in Daoist legends, symbolized by a camellia. He observes that, in the corner of the "Ocean" at the end of the voyage is a single "tree of bodhi," the traditional Buddhist symbol of the fig tree under which the Buddha sat when he attained enlightenment. Nitschke writes that the "treasure boat" stone represents the accumulation of experience during an adult life, and the "turtle" stone represents futile efforts to return to youth.

== Gallery ==
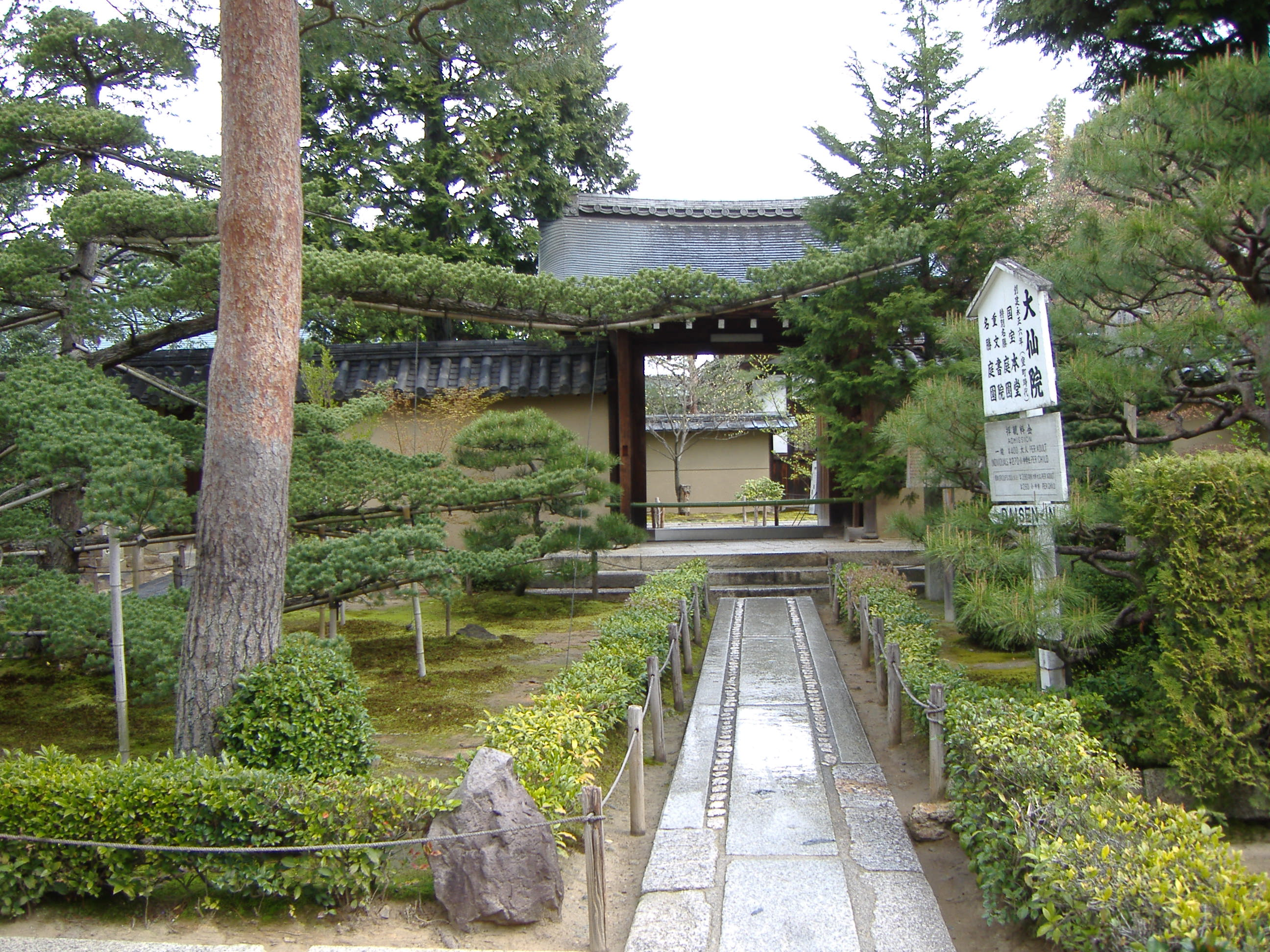
Daisen-in, gateway and approach to the temple

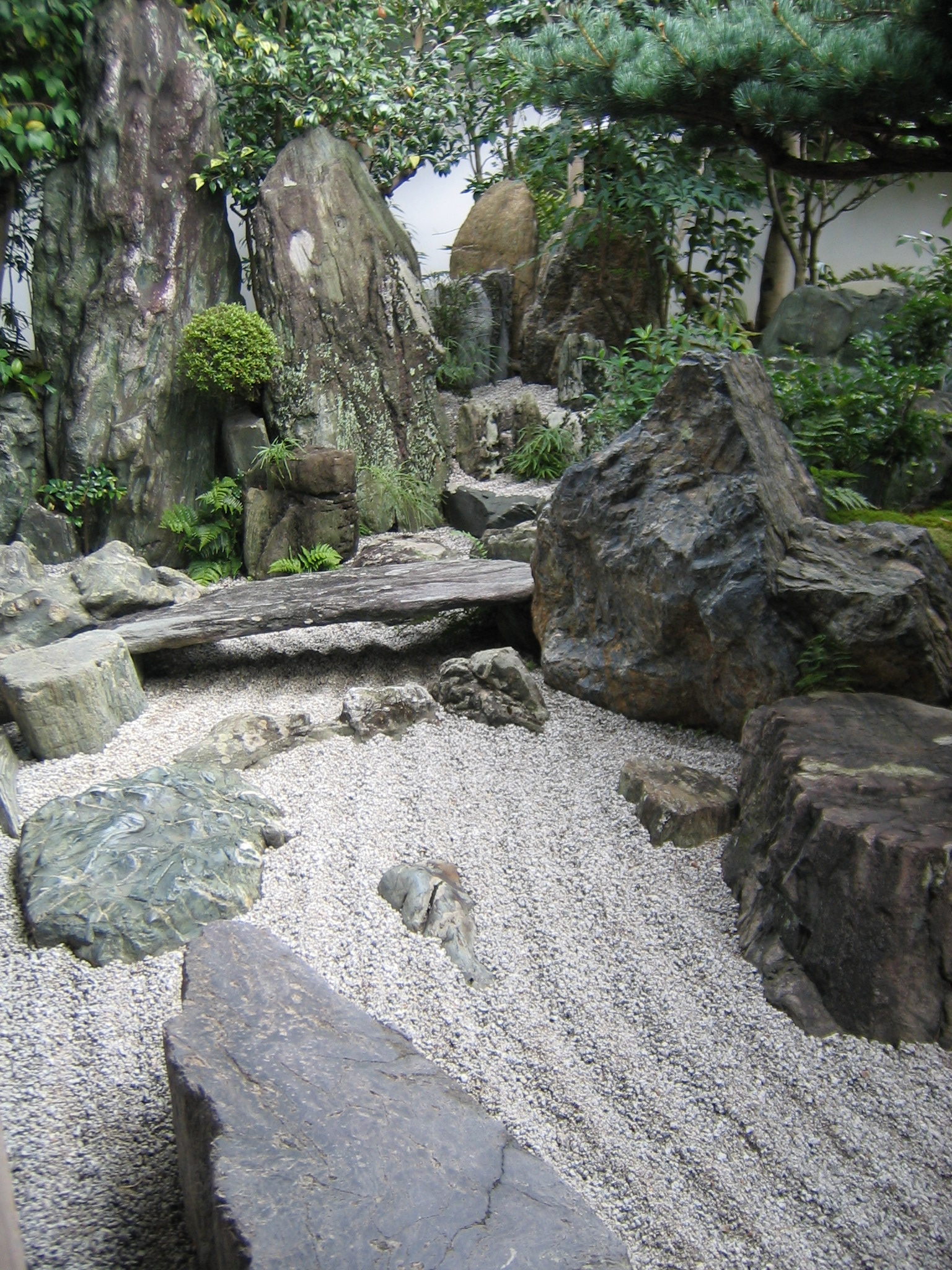
Zen mountains and "waterfall" in the garden of Daisen-in

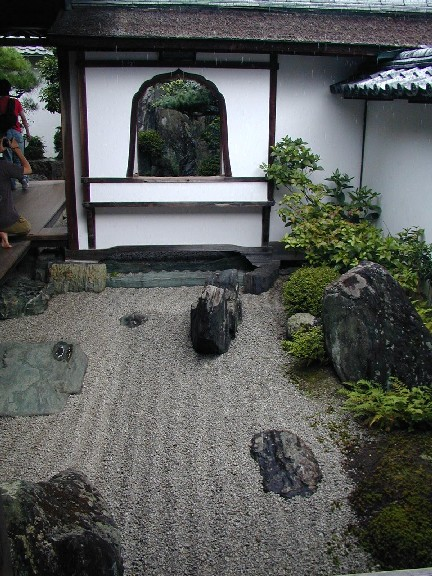
Gravel "river" in garden at Daisen-in

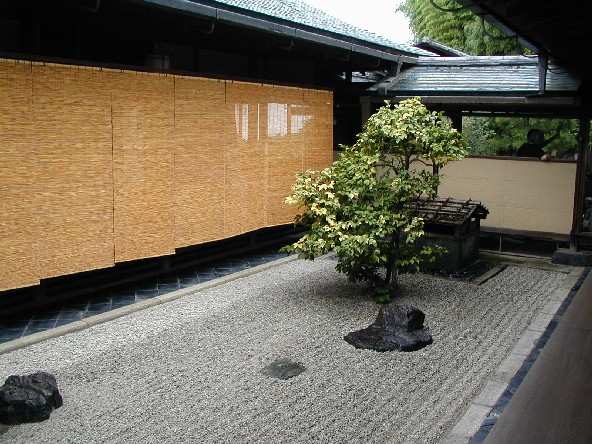
Gravel "Middle Sea" of the Zen garden at Daisen-in

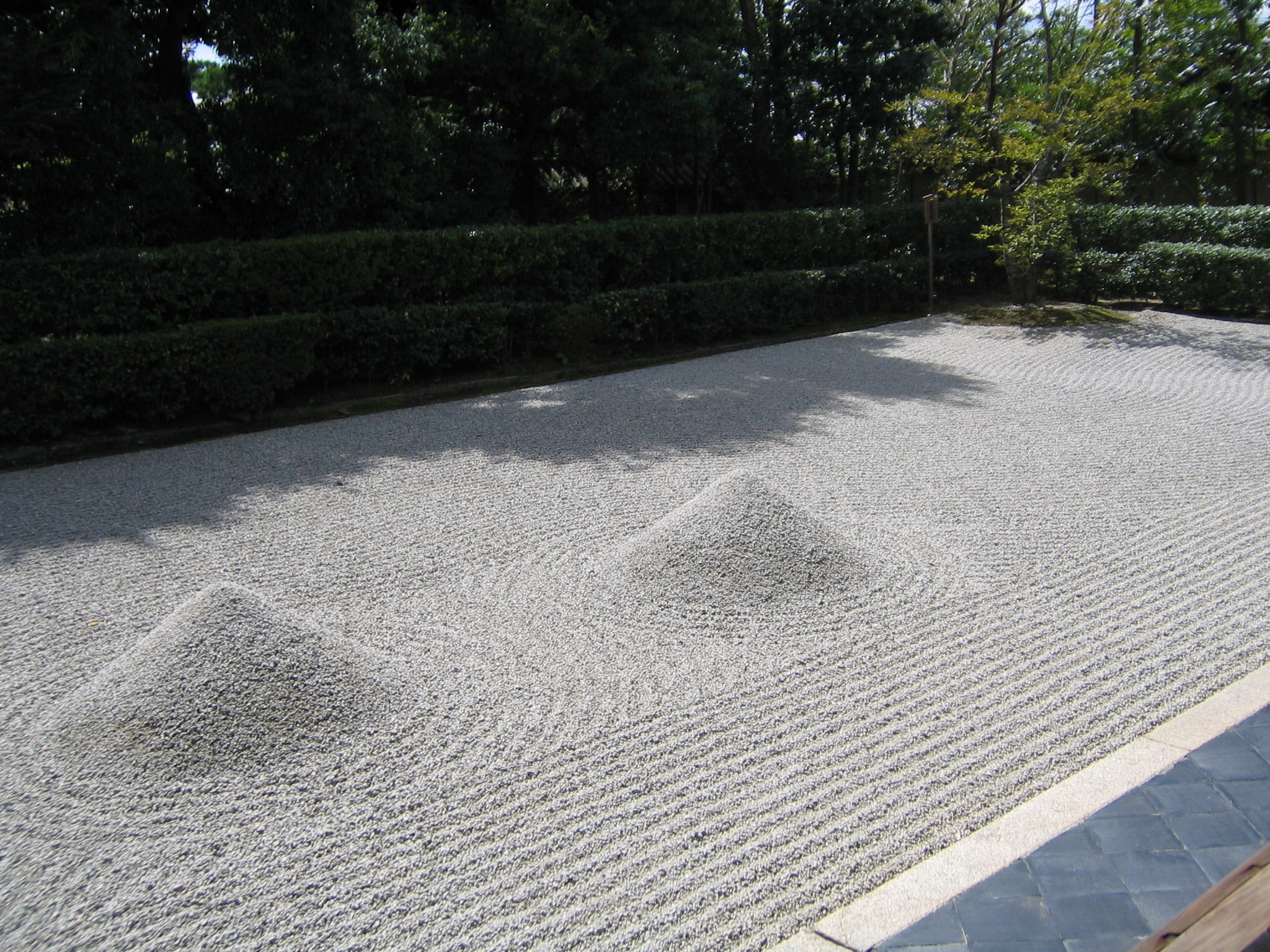
The "Ocean" of the Zen garden at Daisen-in

== See also ==
- Japanese rock garden
- Japanese garden
- List of Special Places of Scenic Beauty, Special Historic Sites and Special Natural Monuments
- List of National Treasures of Japan (temples)
- List of National Treasures of Japan (writings)
- Higashiyama culture in Muromachi period

== Bibliography ==
- Kuitert, Wybe, (2002). Themes in the History of Japanese Garden Art Hawaii University Press, (ISBN 0-8248-2312-5)
- Young, David and Michiko, (2005), The Art of the Japanese Garden, Tuttle Publishing, Vermont and Singapore, (ISBN 978-0-8048-3598-5)
- Nitschke, Gunter, (1999) Le Jardin japonais - Angle droit et forme naturelle, Taschen publishers, Paris (translated from German into French by Wolf Fruhtrunk), (ISBN 978-3-8228-3034-5)
- Baridon, Michel (1998). Les Jardins- Paysagistes, Jardiniers, Poetes., Éditions Robert Lafont, Paris, (ISBN 2-221-06707-X)
- Murase, Miyeko, (1996), L'Art du Japon, La Pochothḕque, Paris, (ISBN 2-253-13054-0)
- Elisseeff, Danielle, (2010), Jardins japonais, Ḗditions Scala, Paris, (ISBN 978-2-35988-029-8)
