= Miyeko Murase =

Japanese art historian (1924–2025)

Miyeko O Murase (村瀬実惠子 Murase Miyeko 27 April 1924 – 12 February 2025) was a Japanese art historian, curator, and scholar known for her work on classical Japanese painting, particularly narrative handscrolls (emakimono), folding screens (byōbu), and calligraphy. She was the Takeo and Itsuko Atsumi Professor of Japanese Art at Columbia University and served for a decade as Special Consultant for Japanese Art at the Metropolitan Museum of Art in New York.

== Biography ==
She was born Ohno Miyeko ( 大野実惠子) in Toyohara, Karafuto (present-day Sakhalin), then under Japanese administration. She was the daughter of Ohno Jitsuzō (大野実蔵), a colonial judge.

She spent her early childhood in Japan’s South Pacific territories, including Saipan and Palau, before returning to Japan during World War II, where she witnessed the American firebombing of Tokyo.

She studied English literature at Tokyo Woman’s Christian University. In the early 1950s, she became one of the first Japanese students to study in the United States through a U.S.-funded educational exchange program. She earned a second bachelor’s degree from the University of Oregon in 1954 and subsequently pursued graduate studies at Columbia University. Initially intending to specialize in Italian Renaissance art, she shifted her focus to Japanese art after attending a seminar with Meyer Schapiro (1904–1996); Rudolf Wittkower (1901–1971), professor of art history at Columbia University, advised her to pursue doctoral research in Japanese art and provided academic guidance during the early stages of her specialization.

Murase completed her PhD in 1962 with a dissertation on the KitanoTenjin engi emaki 北野天神縁起絵巻, a set of late 13th century handscrolls depicting the life of the Heian-period scholar-statesman Sugawara no Michizane (菅原道真 845–903). During her doctoral research, she assisted with the study and restoration of these scrolls at the Metropolitan Museum of Art, marking the beginning of her long association with the institution.

After completing her doctorate in 1962, Murase briefly served as acting director of the newly founded Tikotin Museum of Japanese Art in Haifa, Israel. During her three-month tenure, she organized an ukiyo-e exhibition and gained first-hand experience in museum administration. Upon returning to New York, Murase considered a career in museum work. She was encouraged by Alan Priest (1898–1969), then curator of the Far Eastern Art Department of the Metropolitan Museum of Art, who recognized her potential as a future museum professional. Although she ultimately chose academia, these early experiences informed her later curatorial work at the Metropolitan Museum, where she would serve as Special Consultant for Japanese Art and organize exhibitions.

Murase died on 12 February 2025, at the age of 100.

== Academic career ==
In 1962, Murase joined Department of Art History and Archaeology at Columbia University as an assistant professor. She was promoted to full professor in 1975 and, in 1993, was appointed the Takeo and Itsuko Atsumi Professor of Japanese Art, the first endowed chair in Japanese art history in the United States.

She retired in 1996 but remained actively engaged in research, mentorship, and curatorial work. Early in her academic career, Murase was contemporaneous with other pioneering mid- to late-20th century scholars and curators of East Asian art, including Alexander Coburn Soper (1904-1993), Yoshiaki Shimizu (1936–2021), Sherman E. Lee (1918-2008), and John M. Rosenfield (1924–2013).

She was also a long-time advisor to collector Mary Griggs Burke (1916-2012), assisting in the formation of what became one of the most significant private collections of Japanese art, now divided between the Metropolitan Museum of Art and the Minneapolis Institute of Art. Murase played a key role in establishing The Mary Griggs Burke Center for Japanese Art at Columbia University, which houses one of the most important research collections of Japanese art outside Japan.

Travel was a component of her teaching, emphasizing the role of direct visual study in art-historical training. In 2010, the Murase Travel Grant was established with contributions from Mary Griggs Burke and former students to support graduate research in Japanese art.

== Selected publications ==
- Murasaki Shikibu; Murase, Miyeko; Murasaki Shikibu (1983). Iconography of the Tale of Genji. New York: Weatherhill. ISBN 978-0-8348-0188-2.
- Murase, Miyeko (1983). Emaki: narrative scrolls from Japan. Asia Society, Japan. New York, NY: The Asia Society. ISBN 978-0-87848-060-9.
- Murase, Miyeko (1986). Tales of Japan: scrolls and prints from the New York Public Library ; [exhibition catalogue]. New York Public Library (1st print ed.). New York, NY: Oxford Univ. Pr. ISBN 978-0-19-504020-3.
- Murase, Miyeko (1990). Masterpieces of Japanese screen painting: the American collections. New York: Braziller. ISBN 978-0-8076-1230-9.
- Murase, Miyeko (2000). Bridge of dreams: the Mary Griggs Burke collection of Japanese art. ISBN 978-0-8109-6551-5.
- Murase, Miyeko; Tosa, Mitsuoki, eds. (2001). The tale of Genji: legends and paintings. New York: G. Braziller. ISBN 978-0-8076-1500-3.
- Murase, Miyeko (2002). The written image: Japanese calligraphy and painting from the Sylvan Barnet and William Burto Collection. Metropolitan Museum of Art. New York: Metropolitan Museum of Art. ISBN 978-1-58839-068-4.
- Murase, Miyeko; Amemiya, Mutsuko; Metropolitan Museum of Art (New York, N.Y.), eds. (2003). Turning point: Oribe and the arts of sixteenth-century Japan. New York : New Haven: Metropolitan Museum of Art ; Yale University Press. ISBN 978-1-58839-095-0.
- Murase, Miyeko (2009). Through the seasons: Japanese art in nature [exhibition] Sterling and Francine Clark art institute, Williamston [7 June-18 October 2009]. New Haven (Conn.): Yale university press. ISBN 978-0-300-14188-7.

=== Selected curatorial work ===
From 1996 to 2006, Murase served as Special Consultant for Japanese Art at The Metropolitan Museum of Art, where she curated and advised on exhibitions. Her curatorial projects included:

- Byōbu: Japanese Screens from New York Collections (Asia Society, 1971)
- Tales of Japan: Scrolls and Prints from the New York Public Library (1986)
- Bridge of Dreams: The Mary Griggs Burke Collection of Japanese Art (Metropolitan Museum of Art, 2000)
- Turning Point: Oribe and the Arts of Sixteenth-Century Japan (Metropolitan Museum of Art, 2003–2004)
- The Written Image: Japanese Calligraphy (Metropolitan Museum of Art, 2013)
- Kotobuki: Auspicious Celebrations of Japanese Art in New York Private Collections (Japan Society, 2025)

Murase remained actively involved in exhibition planning until shortly before her death, including work on the 2025 Japan Society exhibition.

== Honors ==
Murase was awarded in 2010 the Order of the Sacred Treasure, Gold Rays with Neck Ribbon, by the Government of Japan in recognition of her distinguished service in promoting Japanese culture internationally.

== Later life ==
Miyeko Murase passed away peacefully on February 12, 2025, at the age of 100, just two months short of her 101st birthday.
