= Kitano Tenjin Engi Emaki =

13th-century Japanese narrative artwork

- 北野天神縁起絵巻 (Japanese)
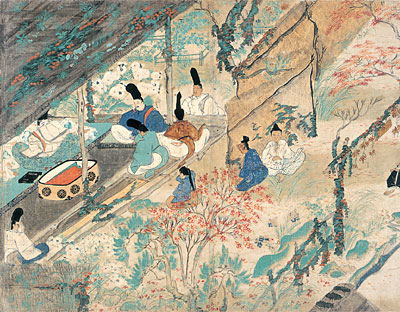
- Sugawara no Michizane in exile after his unjust conviction. The attitude of the people in this colourful scene conveys a deep melancholy. (Jōkyū version, 1219)
- Artist: Fujiwara Nobuzane
- Completion date: c. 1219
- Medium: Emakimono; Paint and Ink on paper handscroll
- Movement: Yamato-e
- Subject: Sugawara no Michizane
- Dimensions: 52 cm (20 in) high; 8.45 m (27.7 ft) to 12.05 m (39.5 ft) long
- Designation: National Treasure
- Location: Kitano Tenmangū, Kyōto

The Kitano Tenjin Engi Emaki (北野天神縁起絵巻; "Scroll on the foundation of the Kitano temple and the life of Sugawara no Michizane", "Illuminated scroll on the history of the god of Kitano", or more simply "Legends of Kitano Tenjin Shrine") is an emakimono or emaki (painted narrative handscroll) from the beginning of the 13th century, in the Kamakura period of Japanese history (1185–1333). An illuminated manuscript, it narrates in eight calligraphed and painted scrolls the life of Sugawara no Michizane and the construction of the Kitano Tenmangū shrine in his honour after his death.

== Background ==
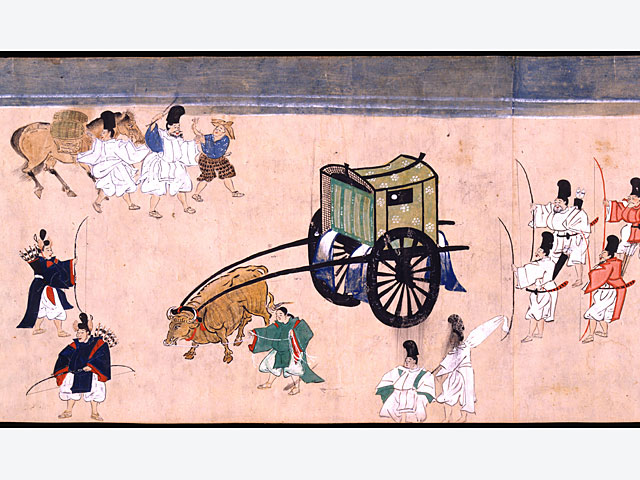
A painting of the genre

Originating in Japan in the sixth or seventh century through trade with the Chinese Empire, emakimono art spread widely among the aristocracy in the Heian period. An emakimono consists of one or more long rolls of paper narrating a story through Yamato-e texts and paintings. The reader discovers the story by progressively unrolling the scroll with one hand while rewinding it with the other hand, from right to left (according to the then horizontal writing direction of Japanese script), so that only a portion of text or image of about 60 cm (24 in) is visible.

The narrative of an emakimono assumes a series of scenes, the rhythm, composition and transitions of which are entirely the artist's sensitivity and technique. The themes of the stories were very varied: illustrations of novels, historical chronicles, religious texts, biographies of famous people, humorous or fantastic anecdotes, etc.

The Kamakura period, the advent of which followed a period of political turmoil and civil wars, was marked by the coming to power of the warrior class (the samurai). Artistic production was very strong, and more varied themes and techniques than before were explored, signalling the "golden age" of emakimono (the 12th and 13th centuries). Under the impetus of the new warrior class in power, emakimono evolved towards a more realistic and composite pictorial style.

== Description ==
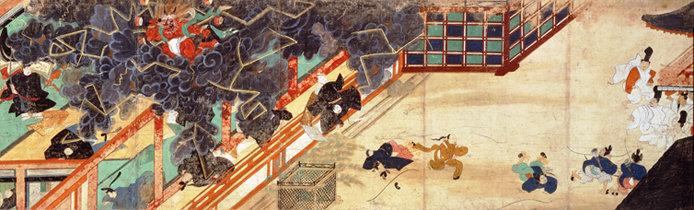
The vengeful ghost of Sugawara no Michizane after his death, painted as a god of thunder

The Kitano Tenjin Engi Emaki narrates the life and death of Sugawara no Michizane (845–903), as well as his deification as Tenjin and the foundation in his honour of the Kitano Tenmangū temple in Kyōto, an important Shinto shrine. In its original version, it consists of eight scrolls 52 cm (20 in) high and 8.45 m (27.7 ft) to 12.05 m (39.5 ft) long, although the end is unfinished. The first portion of the text in the original version includes a claim that it was painted in about 1219; that version is commonly referred to as the Jōkyū (or Shōkyū) version, 1219 having been the first year of the Jōkyū era. The majority of studies of the work focus on the Jōkyū version, which is recognised as a National Treasure of Japan.

The narrative of the Jōkyū version is divided into four unequal parts. The first part relates the life of Michizane, a scholar and statesman who was influential in the Heian-kyō court despite his humble origins, and who became a popular literary figure. Subsequently, the victim of a conspiracy orchestrated by Fujiwara no Tokihira, he was wrongly convicted and died in exile. From the start, he was credited with a divine origin, for he "appeared" as a child in his father's garden; the divine child remains a popular myth of Buddhism, referring to the historical Buddha. Later, his intellectual as well as physical capacities were emphasised, for example through the composition of poems or participation in archery. He died in 903.

In the second part of the Jōkyū version, the vengeful ghost of Michizane returns to earth after his death to torment the actors of the conspiracy, in the form of a god of thunder. Several incidents occur in the years following his death, in particular fires in the capital (Kyōto) and the deaths of his opponents; these misdeeds are swiftly attributed to the spirit of Michizane. More precisely, a priest named Nichizō describes having conversed with him while he crossed the six realms of existence (rokudo), notably the underworld, before returning from the afterlife. Contrary to the original story, Nichizō's journey is recounted in detail, in a fantastic, even Dantesque way.

The court finally decided to build the Kitano Tenmangū shrine in Kyōto in 947 in honour of Michizane in order to calm his mind, a passage recounted in the third part of the work; he is worshipped there under the name of Tenjin, a protective god of arts and letters. Finally, the last part relates various miracles related to the temple.

The narrative and context of the time suggest that the original work was created for spiritual purposes. The Tendai Buddhist school is particularly highlighted in it, so much so that the paintings probably had a didactic value, serving as a support for the teaching or the recitation of Buddhist legends. Sessions of explanation of religious paintings (e-toki) were common in the Kamakura period. In addition, any such didactic aspect would also explain the unusually large height of the scroll and the large number of versions. The esoteric beliefs of the time may also suggest that its function was to appease tormented spirits.

== Dating, author and sponsor ==
The story in the Kitano Tenjin Engi Emaki is based on a text (an engi, or story of the founding of a temple) said to have been written shortly before 1194, about 30 years prior to the Jōkyū version's creation.

Apart from an abandoned theory which attributed the Jōkyū version to Fujiwara no Nobuzane, no clues about the artist of the Jōkyū version have survived. However, the texts, present only in the first six scrolls, could be attributed in part to the sponsor, Kujō Michiie, according to Minamoto Toyomune.

Kujō Michiie donated the Jōkyū version to the Kitano Tenmangū shrine, probably to strengthen the political position of the Kujō family in the early 13th century (an unstable period).

== Style and composition ==
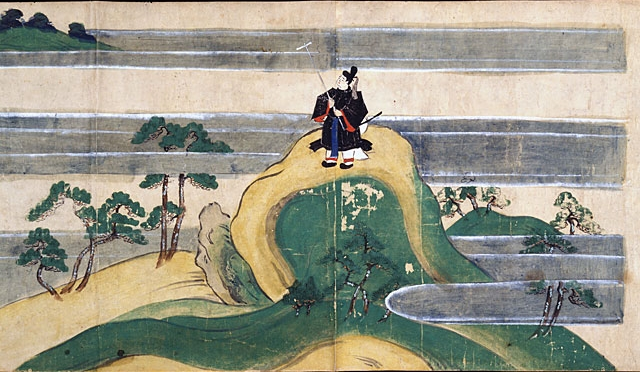
Famous scene showing Michizane cursing the gods after his exile; the colours are rich and the hero is disproportionately represented

The Yamato-e style of painting in the Kitano Tenjin Engi Emaki is characterised by bright colors and freedom of lines; sometimes even the outlines are omitted, using the technique of boneless painting (mokkotsu). The composition also plays on the differences of scale, as in the often depicted scene of the prayer of Michizane atop a mountain: he is shown is overly large to represent his strength of character, despite a humble posture that makes him an "allegorical figure of man". Realistic art characteristic of the Kamakura period is also displayed in the scenes of movement, such as the jostling or fleeing of a character.

Although Buddhism greatly inspired Japanese art at the time, the style of the Kitano Tenjin Engi Emaki is also linked to Shinto, resulting in greater freedom and humanity. This aspect is shown particularly in the landscapes, insisting on the details and the animist spirit, according to T. Lesoulc'h. The latter also notes in places the nervousness of the features, similar to the Song dynasty wash technique characteristic of Zen Buddhism.

However, Buddhist iconography remains heavily used, whether through the narration of the life of Michizane, modelled on the life of the historical Buddha, or the presence of Buddhist creatures, or the illustration of the six realms of existence. So, for example, the representation of the God of Thunder in the work is very similar to those of the statues of Raijin (雷神; lit. "Thunder God") and Fūjin (風神; lit. "Wind God") at Sanjūsangen-dō.

== Historiographical value ==
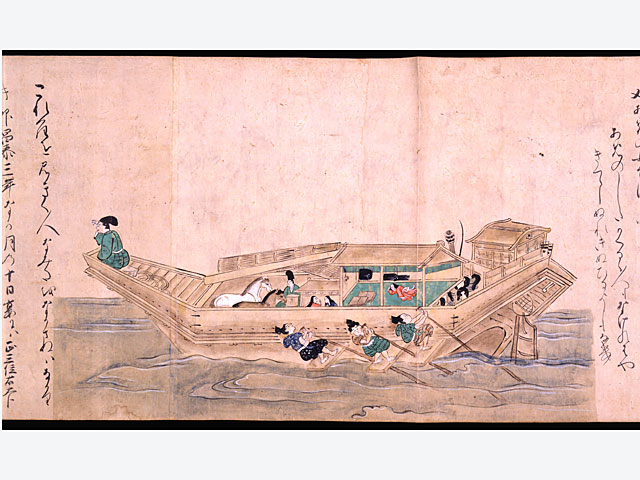
A medieval oar-propelled boat; this model was reproduced in actual size at the Hiroshima Prefectural Museum of History, Fukuyama

Besides its historical and religious content, the Kitano Tenjin Engi Emaki offers insight into everyday life, not of the time of Michizane, but of that of the artist 300 years later. The latter painted, for example, various rites and birth ceremonies or the outfits of young monks in the temples.

A scene from the first part of the work shows a boat propelled by six rowers, testimony of medieval Japanese ships of which no example remains.

More generally, the architecture of the characters' habitats, their internal layout, the clothes, the festivities, the wooden bridges, the graves, the pets, the children who appear very frequently, and a multitude of other details are revealed by a study of the work by the Kanagawa University.

== Legacy ==
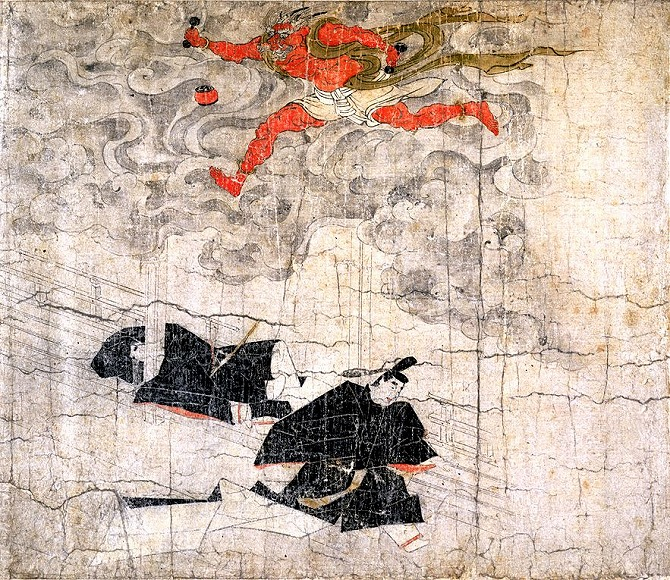
A scene from the Kōan version (1278), in which the colour is much lighter

Over thirty later versions of the Kitano Tenjin Engi Emaki can be identified, created especially during the 14th and 15th centuries, both by amateurs and by famous painters such as Tosa Mitsunobu, because of the growing popularity of the cult of Tenjin.

Among the best known of the later versions of the work are the Kōan version (1278) by Tosa Yukimitsu, whose light-coloured style would influence several later scrolls, as well as the Matsuzaki version (1311) by Dōchō and Ryūshin, a very elegant and decorative work, with several differences from the original Jōkyū version. Comprising six scrolls, the last of which recounts the founding of the Matsuzaki shrine, this version is traditionally divided into thirty-three sections per scroll, a number symbolising the forms the bodhisattva Kannon may take, Tenjin being regarded, according to syncretic Shinto-Buddhist belief, as a manifestation of the eleven-headed Kannon. Particularly well preserved, it is said to have been copied directly from the drawings of the Kitano Tenjin engi emaki, and also served as a support for the monthly gatherings of the Tenjin-kō, held on the eighteenth day of each month among farming communities.

From the point of view of the narrative, the various versions are generally divided into three branches, according to the introductory sentence in each version:

- in the first branch is the original Jōkyū version, as well as the Sugitani Jinja and the Egara Tenjinsha scrolls (1319);
- then come in particular the scrolls of the temples at Tsuda Tenman jinnja (1298) and Kitano Tenman-gū (1503); and
- the last branch intersects with another version of the Kitano Tenman-gū as well as the Matsuzaki Tenjin (1311).

The original version of the scroll also influenced other types of paintings, such as the famous Screens of the Thunder and Wind Gods by Tawaraya Sōtatsu, as well as possibly other paintings depicting the ways of existence (rokudo-e and jikkai-zu), in the form of a kakemono at the Eikan-dō Zenrin-ji temple in Kyōto.

== See also ==
- List of National Treasures of Japan (paintings)
- National Treasure (Japan)
