= Ancient furniture =

Furniture in the ancient world

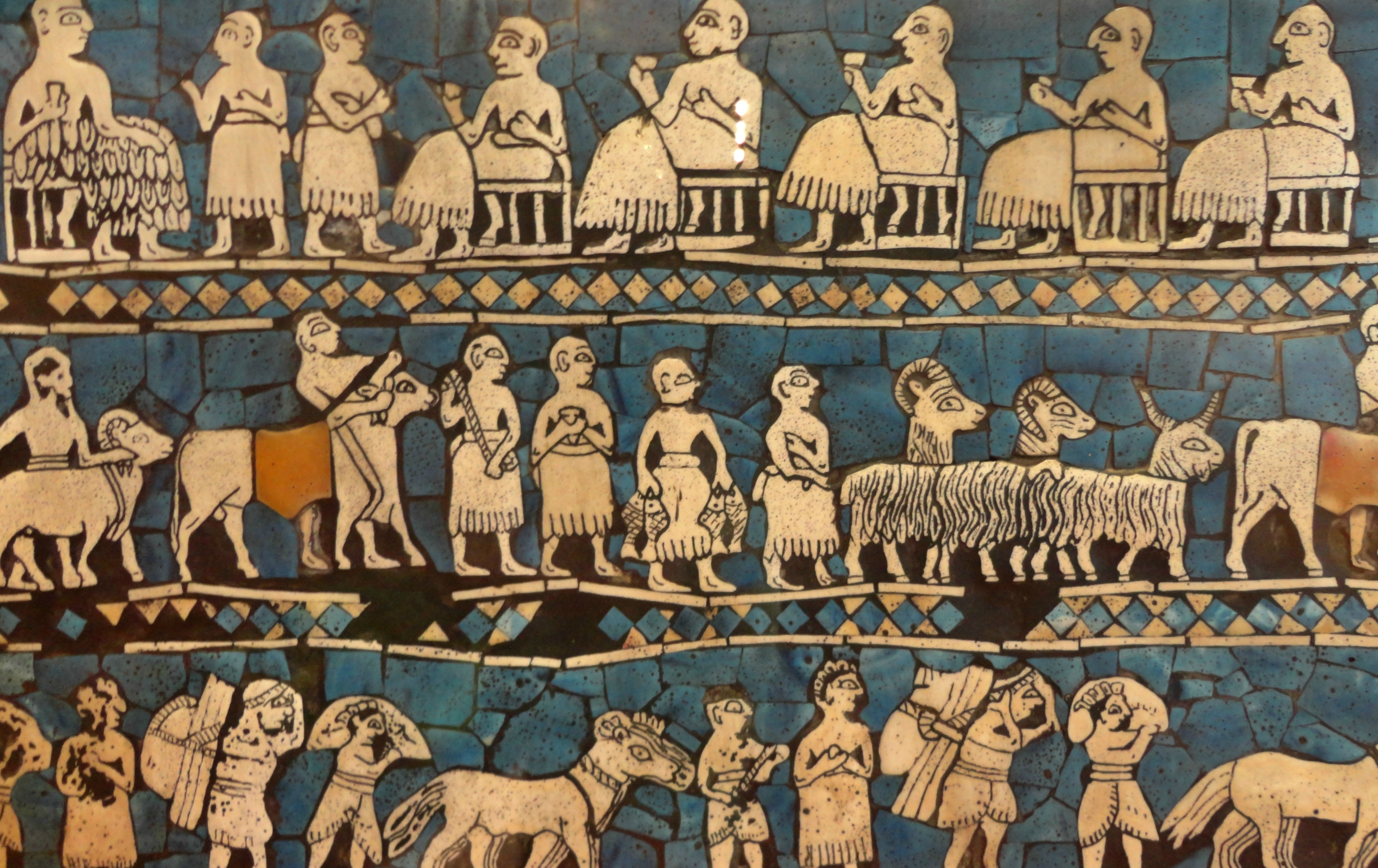
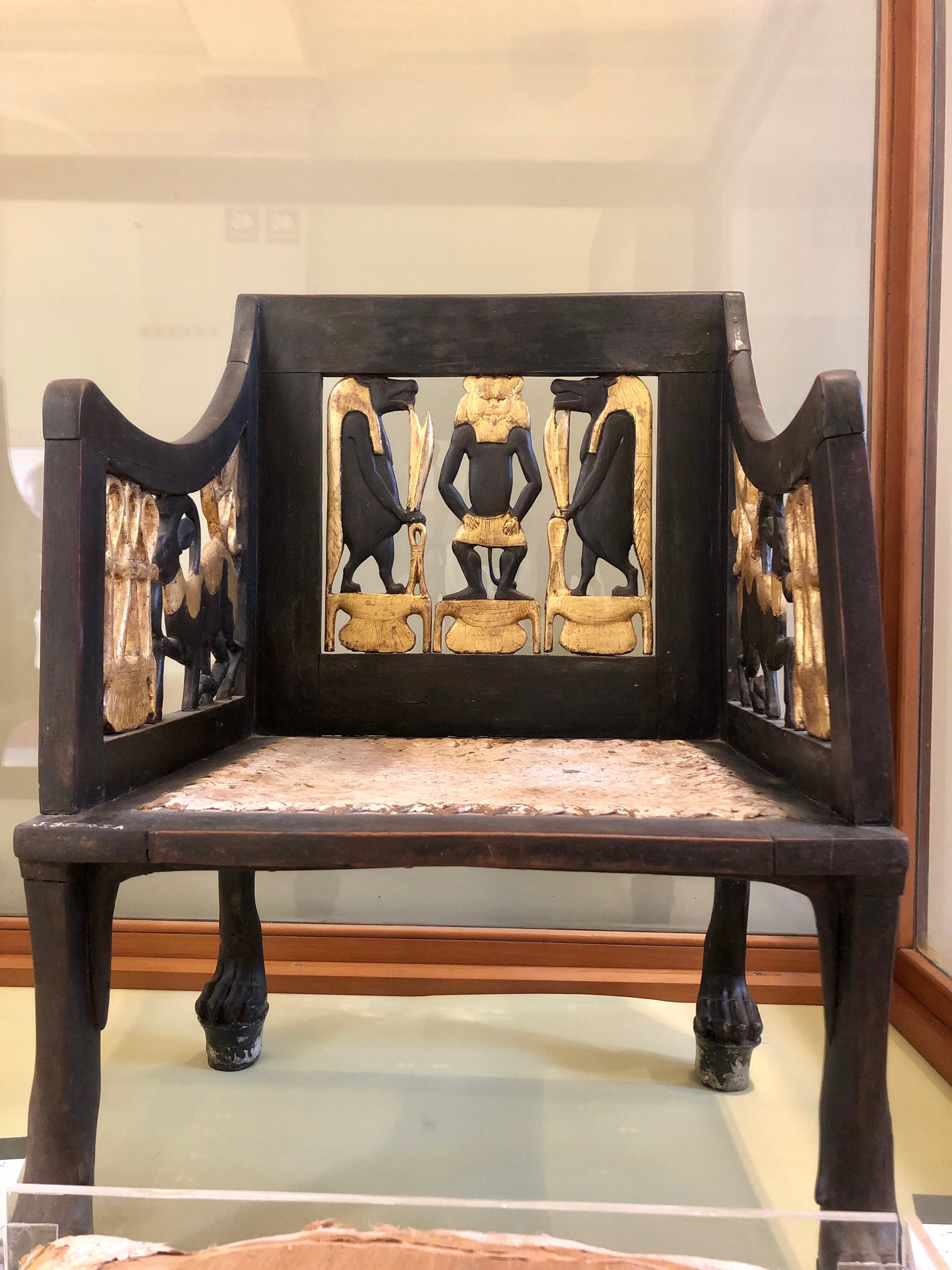
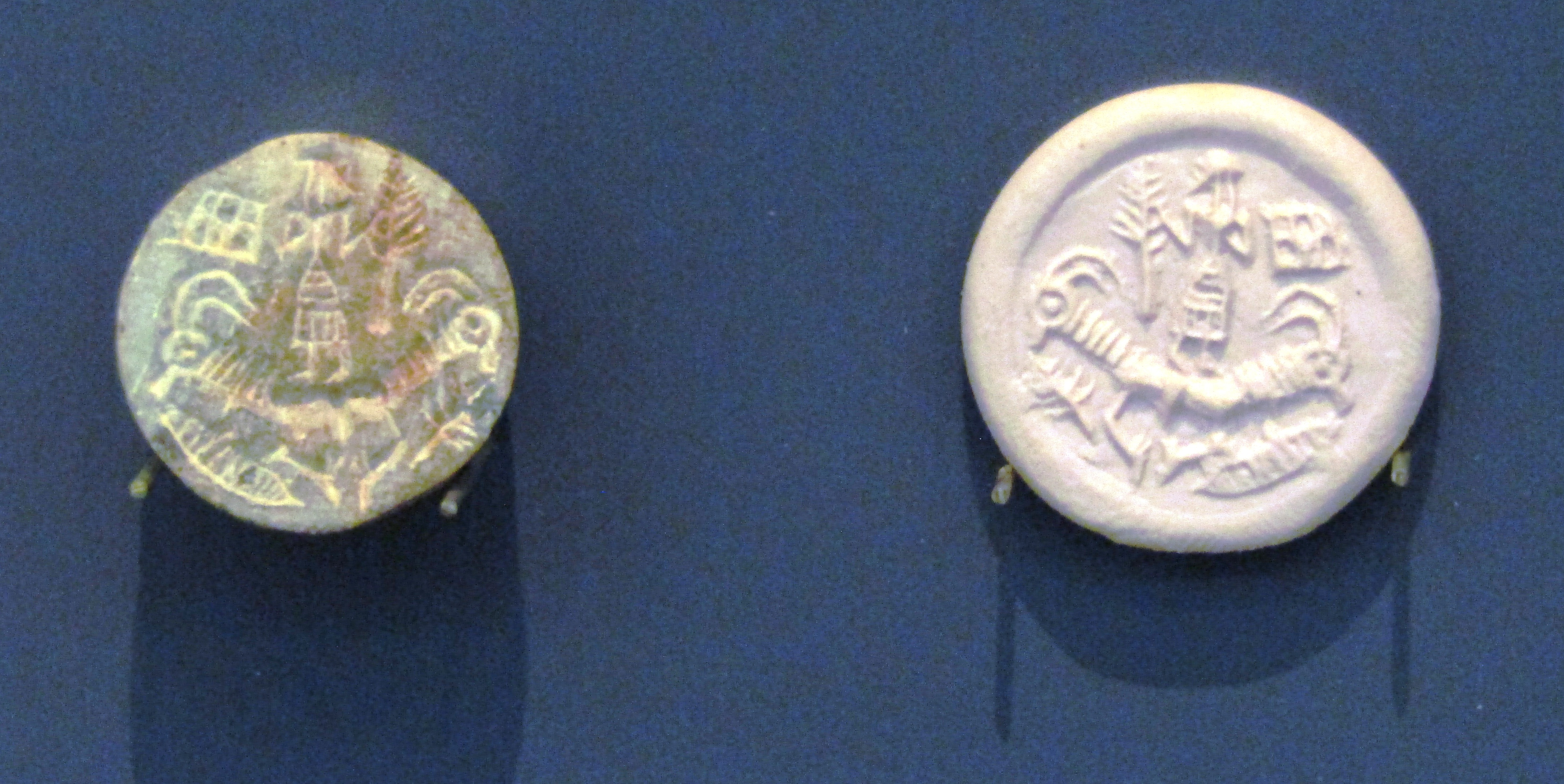
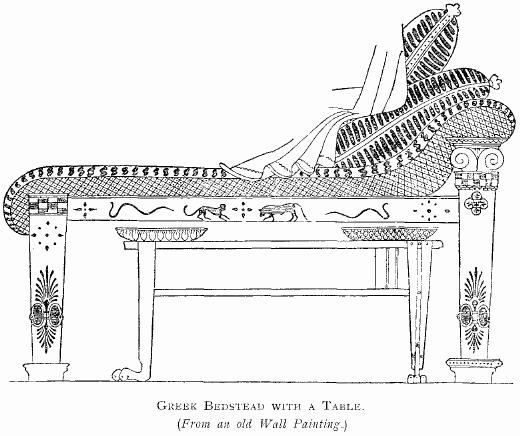
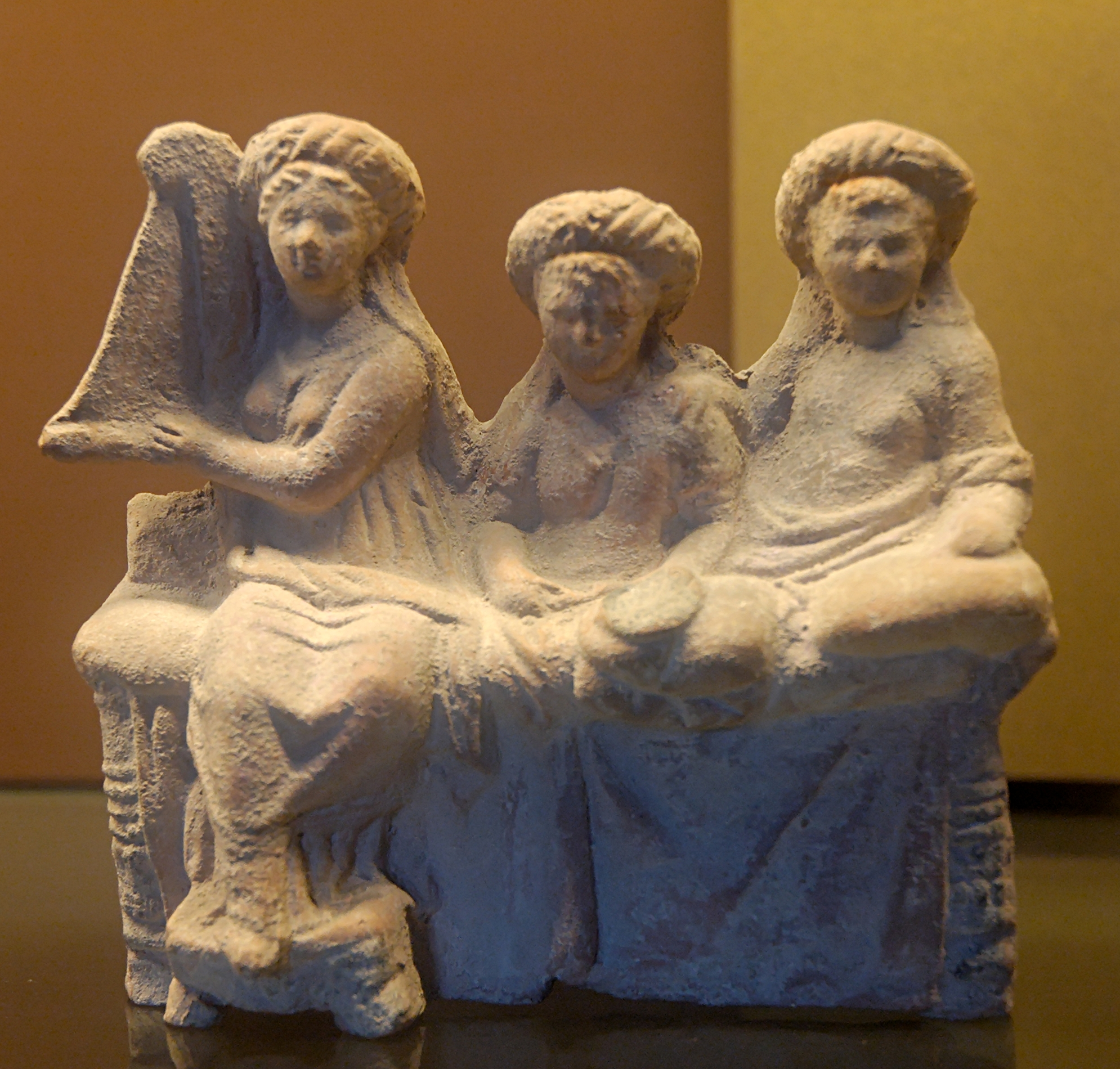
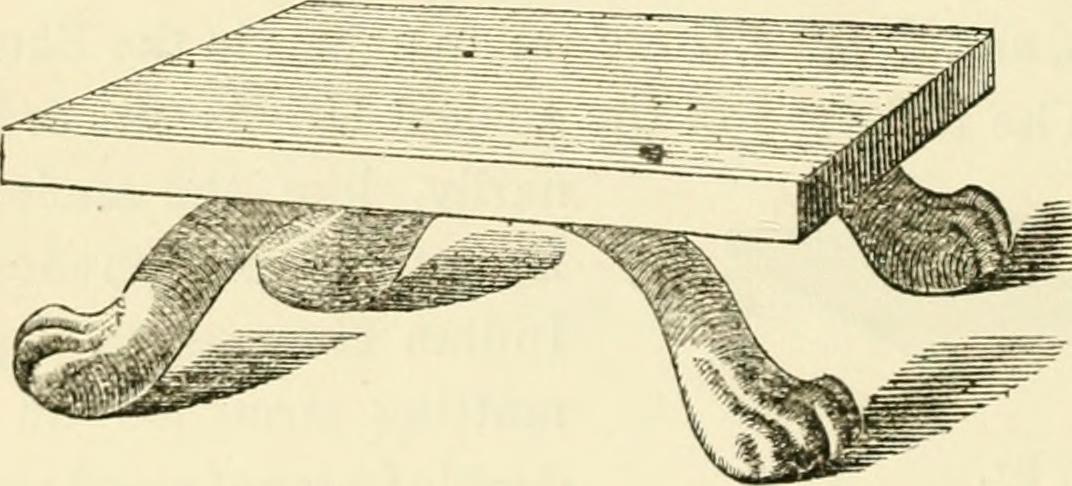
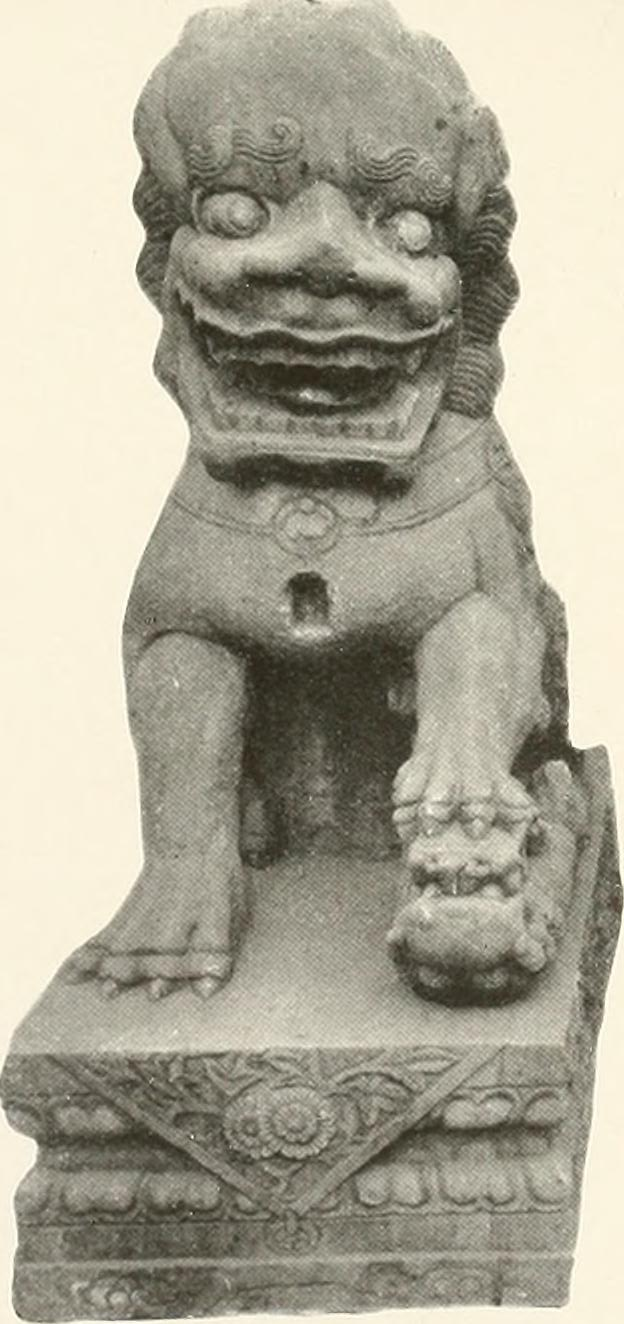
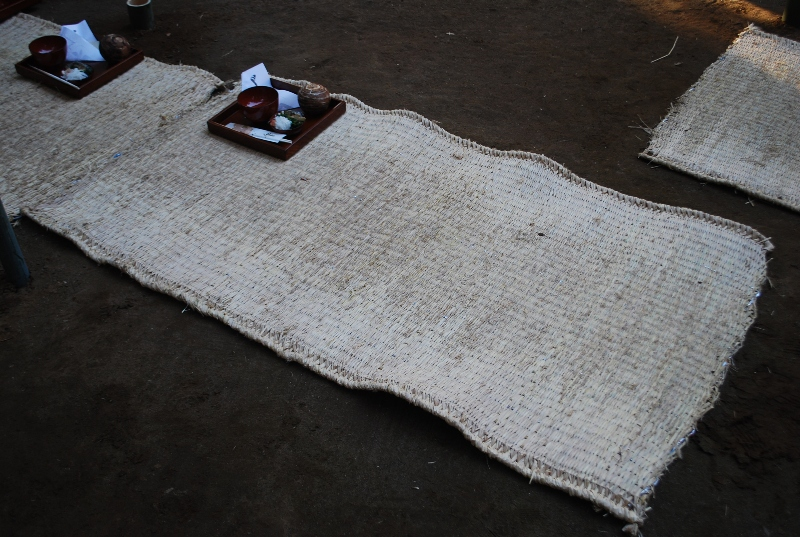
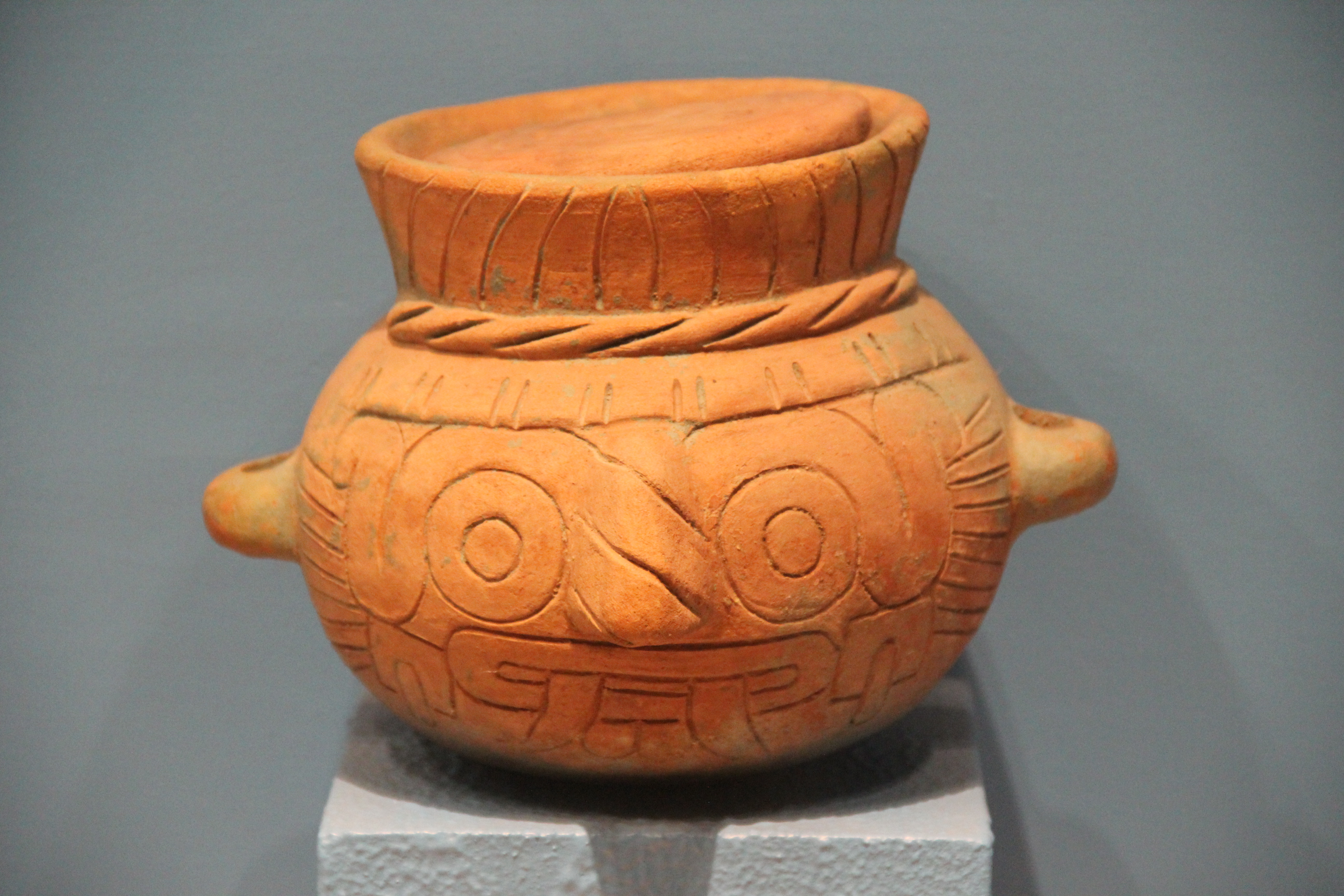
From left to right: Image from the Standard of Ur, Ancient Egyptian chair, Dilmunite seal, ancient Greek bed, ancient Roman couch, ancient Indian chair, ancient Chinese bronze sculpture, mushiro mat, and Aztec pottery.

Ancient furniture was made from many different materials, including reeds, wood, stone, metals, straw, and ivory. The furniture was decorated through processes like upholstery, inlaying, and through the use of finials.

It was common for ancient furniture to have religious or symbolic purposes. The Incans had chacmools which were dedicated to sacrifice. Similarly, in Dilmun they had sacrificial altars. In many civilizations, certain types of furniture were reserved for upper-class citizens. Stools and thrones made for nobility in Ancient Egypt were made of fine imported wood, occasionally animal bone, and were painted, gilded, and inlaid with metals. In Mesopotamia, tables were decorated with expensive metals, chairs would be padded with felt, rushes, and upholstery. Some chairs had metal inlays.

== Mesopotamia ==
=== Sumeria ===
==== Materials ====
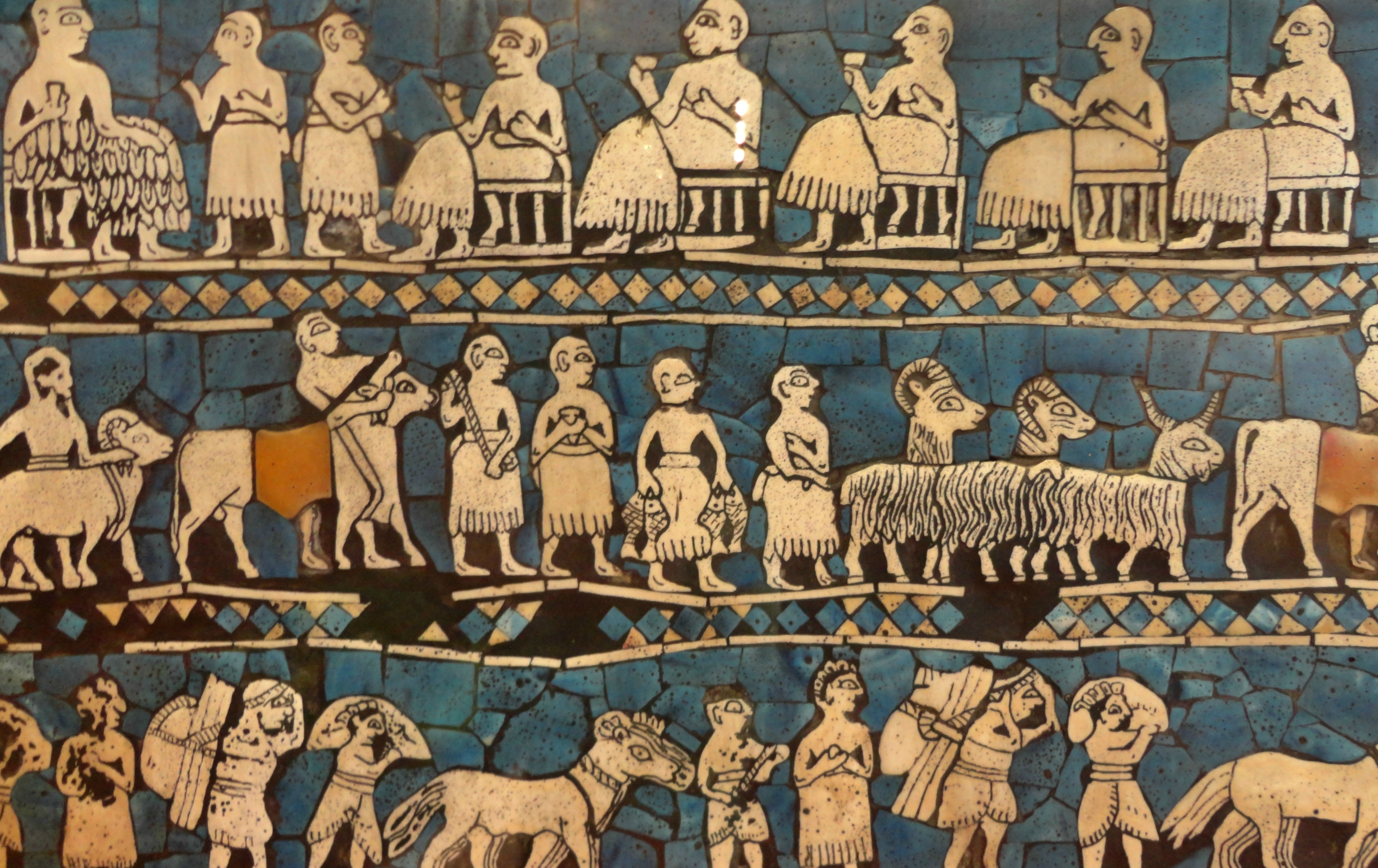
Images from the Standard of Ur

Most Sumerian furniture was constructed out of wood, reeds, and other natural materials. Sumerian records mention using Halub wood to make beds, bed frames, furniture legs, chairs, foot-stools, baskets, containers, drinking vessels, and other prestigious goods. Timber would have been imported from Lebanon, was used for carpentry. Other types of wood such as were kusabku, Sulum Meluhi wood, and date palm were also used. Kusakbu wood, which was either teak or mangrove wood, could be used for inlaying thrones with lapis lazuli. Sulum Meluhi wood may have been ebony, though no ebony has been found at archaeological sites. Another possibility is rosewood imported from Harappa. Date palm was imported from Meluhha. The source of date palm is a contentious topic. Because date palm grew in southern Mesopotamia, they may have not imported it, but rather imported a material similar to date palm. Bamboo or sugarcane from Magan was used by Sumerians, described as "reeds bundled together to look like wood." Other wood used by the Sumerians included palmwood, wicker wood, hardwood. Felt, rushes, leather, animal skin, and wool were used to make materials such as rugs and padding for chairs. Metals like bronze, copper, silver, and gold had many uses in Sumeria, such as inlaying. Sometimes metals would be used to make rings for furniture legs.

==== Chairs ====
Beds, stools, and chairs made of palmwood or woven reeds were used in Sumeria. Wealthy citizens would have chairs padded with felt, rushes, and leather upholstery. The most expensive chairs were inlaid with bronze, copper, silver, and gold. In Akkad, the finest furniture would be inlaid or overlaid with panels and ornaments of metals, gemstones, ivory, faience. Chairs would also have brightly colored wooden and ivory finials depicting arms and bull's heads. Sometimes these finials would be cast-bronze or carved-bone. Oftentimes the chairs would have bronze panels that had images of griffins and winged deities carved into them. The Royal Standard of Ur showcases the king of Ur on a low-back chair with animal legs. The seats depicted on the standard were likely made of rush and cane. During this period of Sumerian history, chairs were not used by the majority of people, with rugs and pillows on the floor being far more common. Low-backed chairs with curved or flat seats and turned legs were incredibly common in the Akkadian Empire.

==== Beds ====
Although there were beds in Sumeria, most people slept on floor mats rather than beds. The Sumerian bed was a wooden bed on a wooden frame. The bed frame was a tall head-board decorated with pictures of birds and flowers. Sometimes the legs would be inlaid with precious metals and shaped to look like animal's paws. Some Akkadian beds had ox-hoof feet. The upper class in Sumeria would use leather, cloth strips, and carefully woven reeds to form the sleeping platform. Wealthy Mesopotamians had beds with wooden frames and mattresses stuffed with cloth, goat's hair, wool, or linen. The marriage bed was an important kind of bed in Sumeria. It was where couples engaged in sexual intercourse after a marriage

==== Mats ====
People would cover their floors with mats woven from reeds, animal skin rugs, and woolen hangings. During the early parts of Sumerian history, reed mats would be fastened to sticks and stuck into the ground or houses. Sometimes reed-mats were used to make houses. The roofs of certain houses would be flat mud spread out over mats, with the mats supported by cross beams. Another way of supporting these huts was to tie bundles of reeds together and bend the top inwards. These bundles would serve as arches. Some food would have been spread over mats. One Sumerian text explains that a person should spread cooked mash over reed mats. Other Sumerian texts talk about covering chariots in reed mats. Mats could have also been used to cover skeletons.

==== Household furniture ====
It was uncommon for most houses to have a lot of furniture as most furniture was reserved for the wealthy. The majority of furniture in Sumeria was made of wicker wood. Storage chests were common, and were typically made from reed or wood. Some were elaborately carved. Stools, tables, and reed mats were also common. People would use baskets made of reed, wicker wood, or straw; and bins made of sun-dried clay, palmwood, or reeds for storage. Sumerians would have household vessels made of clay, stone copper, and bronze. Braziers burning animal dung were used to heat homes. People would light their houses by placing a wick made of reed or wool in sesame seed oil then lighting it. Statues would sometimes be kept inside houses to ward off evil spirits. In Mesopotamian art, some gods were depicted as sitting on stools, which may represent temples or the gods' seat on Earth. In ancient Sumeria, doors would be made out of wood or red ox-hide. A variety of furniture dedicated to relaxing existed in ancient Mesopotamia. Some ancient art depicts people lounging on sofas. The legs of the sofas had iron panels that depicted women and lions. In Mesopotamia bathrooms would have had bathtubs, stools, jars, mirrors, and large water pitchers occasionally with a pottery dipper. Rich Sumerians would have toilets and proper drainage systems.

==== Archaeology ====
Because of the perishable materials common throughout Sumerian furniture, archaeological evidence for Mesopotamian furniture is limited. The few sources we have consists of artifacts the Assyrians gained from their conquests. From the Assyrian records we learn that Mesopotamian furniture was similar to Egyptian furniture, though it was heavier and had more curves than Egyptian furniture. Another source for Sumerian furniture were depictions from the city of Ur.

=== Babylonia ===
There are few sources for Babylonian furniture. As the Babylonians did not put any furniture in tombs, aside from a few drinking vessels and some jewelry, few examples of Babylonian furniture survive. There are also few surviving artistic depictions of Babylonian furniture, aside from a few seals and terracottas. Thus our main sources for Babylonian furniture are textual. One Babylonian text mentions large and small chests, as well as 60 different types of chairs. Each chair was of a different usage and materials. The source mentions the footstool, claiming that it is "for bathing, portable, for the worker, for the barber, for the road, for the seal cutter, for the metal-worker, for the potter." The text also mentions foot-rests and beds. Beds are described as "to sit on, to lie on, of reeds, with oxen-feet, with goat's hair, stuffed with wool, stuffed with goat hair, of Sumerian type," and "of Akkadian type" Babylonian wills often mention important pieces of furniture, such as chests to store textiles, clothing, beds, chairs and stools.

The few artistic depictions we have of Babylonian furniture showcase a variety of chairs and miniature models of beds. These chairs would often have their legs carved in the shape of claws, paws, or oxen-feet. Chairs from the Old and Middle Babylonian period with curved backs are depicted in reliefs from the late third millennium BCE. Some plaques from the reign of Gudea showcase chairs with sloped backs. The beds would have been made of clay and had rectangular bed frames. It is common for these artistic depictions of beds to show a couple in the act of sexual intercourse.

Babylonian tables would be covered or inlaid with ivory. Depictions from the Neo-Babylonian Period display eating scenes, with tables and chairs being used together. These tables also became more elaborate during this period. Some household items include vessels for oil, wine, beer, and honey. Other household items include ladders, bowls, bowls, mortars, pestles, reed-mats, cushions, tables, chairs, grindstones, ovens, and furnaces. Reeds and palm branches were common materials used to make cheap everyday products such as mats, screens, boxes, containers, baskets, and colanders. Clay was a much more common material. It was used to make plates, jars, jugs, storage, and cooking tools. Metal, especially copper, was used to make cooking pots, mortars, and iron implements in mills.

The Babylonians were highly specialized in carpentry and "cabinet-making"; they would export furniture to the Assyrians and other civilizations. The most elaborate pieces were found in temples.

=== Assyria ===
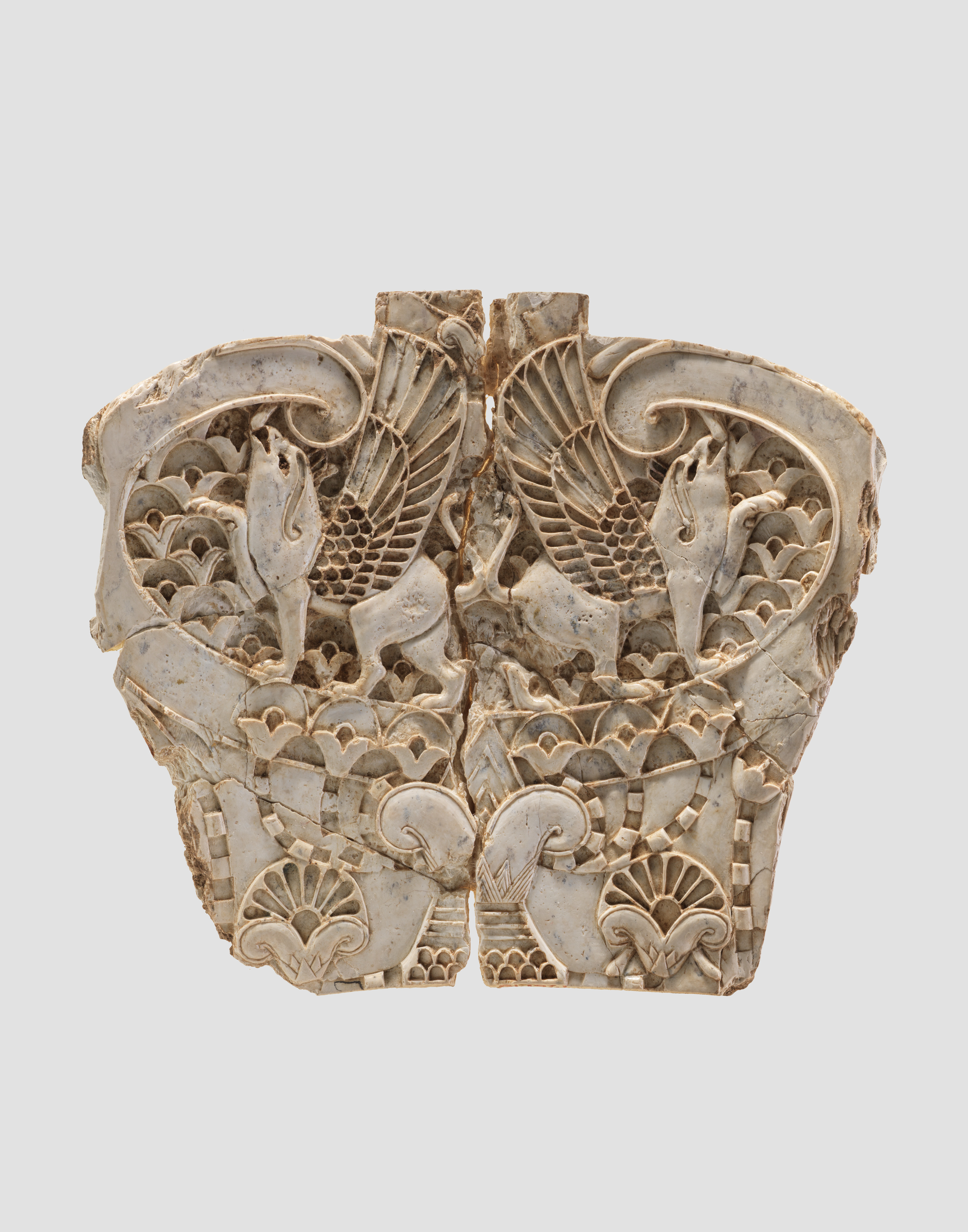
A plaque from ancient Assyria

In ancient Assyria plaques would be used as furniture. The ancient Assyrians had carved ivory pieces. They were used to make fan handles, boxes, and furniture inlays. The furniture would commonly depict flowers. There was a wide variety of Assyrian chairs. Some chairs had backs and arms, some resembled a footstool. Sometimes Assyrian chairs would be placed so high that a footstool was required to sit on them. Chairs and footstools would be furnished with cushions covered in tapestries. Wealthier Assyrians would also furnish their couches and bed frames with tapestries. Poor Assyrians would have a single mattress instead of a bed. Assyrian tables had four legs, which were often inlaid with ivory. Other metals were inlaid into chairs and sofas. Households would also have bronze tripods for the purpose of holding vases of wine and water. Some vases were made of terracota, these vases could also be glazed with a blue vitrified substance resembling vases used by the Egyptians. The tripods used to hold these vases had feet shaped to resemble oxen or clinched hands.

== Egypt ==
=== Chairs ===
==== Old Kingdom ====
Tombs dating back to the First Dynasty have wooden furniture. This furniture is usually decorated with basketry motifs, ivory inlays, hippopotamus and elephant ivories, and was finely carved in the shape of bull legs. The base of each leg terminated in a ribbed cylinder design to protect the foot of the support. Furniture legs were finished with the pedestal feet.

The chair developed from the stool in the second dynasty. A stele found in a tomb from this time period depicts Prince Nisuheqet sitting on a chair. The chair has a high back made of plain sawn boards, suggesting that the earliest chairs were used by the wealthy. Egyptian chairs likely continued to be status symbols. In another tomb from the third dynasty, more depictions of chairs can be found.

King Khafre's chair is shown to imitate animal parts. This design feature is not unique to Old Kingdom furniture, dating back to Predynastic times. However, the innovation of using animal hooves as a decoration for furniture is new to the Fourth Dynasty. This decoration could have been fashioned from ivory. Animal legs were usually supported on a small cone-shaped pedestal.

In the Old Kingdom, stretched leather straps was used to build the seats of chairs, and this practice continued throughout other eras of the Kingdom.

==== Middle Kingdom ====
In the Middle Kingdom of Egypt, chairs were still straight-legged with upholstered vertical backs. During this period, chairs became more stylized. The legs of these chairs were animal-shaped; however, instead of bovine shaped, they were slender and gazelle shaped or lion shaped. The joints were not jointed and tied together with leather, but rather glued and dwelled. Chairs in this period were now designed to be shaped like the human back. The backs of chairs were carved from wooden blocks or angled battens. Steles dating back to the Middle Kingdom showcase chairs elevated on small platforms and deeply recessed back supports with a center supporting a strut. Inlays or paintwork simulating animal skins may have been used to decorate chairs.

Another Middle Kingdom chair, called the Anderson chair, has an ornament made of alternating light and dark wood on its back. Circular inlays on the back of the chair and bones on the top rail are also present. Like other Egyptian chairs, the legs were carved to appear like a lion's legs. The feet were carved on horizontally lined spools, and wide tenons fastened with pegs and mortised joints are used on the chair. The chair was shaped through downwards sloping and conclave curving to conform to the lumbar area of the back. The outer back of the chair consists of three straight splats and seven vertical strips, both of which mortised at the top and bottom. Mortises, along with wide tenons, were used to make the joints of this chair.

==== New Kingdom ====
Much of the old Egyptian furniture that exists today has only survived due to ancient Egyptian beliefs about the afterlife. Furniture would be placed in tombs, and as a result would survive to the modern day. However, much of this furniture is from the New Kingdom of Egypt, specifically the 18th Dynasty. Chairs from the eighteenth dynasty of Egypt had legs made out of a square sectioned wood. The tenons on the side rail passed through the top of each leg at top right angles. The rails, combined with curved braces pegged into the chair, would support the back. The joints would have wedges to give the frame rigidity. The webbing of the sting passes through holes drilled into the chair. A vertical bridle joint connected to the legs springs off two vertical back legs. The legs of the chairs would be carved to look like animals. Some legs were of oxen, Amenhotep III is depicted as being seated on a low-back lion legged chair. Sometimes the back support of the chairs would be added through an upright cut into a piece of wood. The top rail of the back support would be held together by upright extensions. Beneath these extensions would lie a frame of the back support which would enclose vertical panels.

Another open back chair has finely carved legs shaped like a lion. The back legs of this chair are not extended like the previous chair; however, an additional vertical element is jointed to the seat above and the back legs. Seven inclined boards are used to ouch or klinē, in metal and reconstructed woconstruct the back panels of the chair. Between each of these boards thinner stringing strips of alternatively colored wood. The outer strips are miter in the corners and the panels are framed with horizontal strips of wood. A single elbowed bracket and a pin joint are used to hold the seat together. The elbow bracket is made of a light colored wood with dark veneers, which were cut to fit the shape of the wood. They were then attached to the side rails and the back support by dowels.

A different kind of open back chair was found at Lahun. Each joint was glued and held together by two dowels. Although a single dowel was used to mortise, tenoned, and dwell the seats to the side rail. A hole would be drilled through the joints allowing string to pass through it, strengthening the seat frame. Mortise and tenons on the would be used to attach the chairs back panel. The chairs back panel was constructed out of vertical panels of wood placed into frame. The outer frame was mortised and tenoned together. Horizontal joints would be used to joint together the bottom rail and vertical rail of the frame. In the Metropolitan Museum of Art an ancient Egyptian chair is preserved. This chair is constructed out of buxus and acaia wood. The seat is supported by lion shaped legs on a drum. Many opposing colored wood panels and strips were used to make the back of the chair. On another frame of wood placed above this symbols of the god Bes were carved. A similar chair has been preserved by the National Museum of Scotland; however, the seat of this chair is supported by four round-top legs which are transfixed at right angles by the seat rails.

In a tomb belonging to Senenmut's mother Hatnofer a chair made of boxwood and ebony has been found. The seat of the chair was made of string mesh composed of triple stands of linen cords interwoven into a herring bone pattern. Its legs are carved to look like lion legs. Mortise and tenon joints were used to hold the chair together. An openwork design of the god Bes also appears on the chair. It is flanked by symbols of Isis and Osiris made of ebony. This chair did not belong to Senenmut, it belonged to his mother Hatnofer. Another chair, of a similar type to Hatnofer's chair, had a wooden back frame with no marquetry that enclosed five vertical slats. A dark reddish hardwood was used to build this chair. This chair was once veneered with strips of ebony and ivory. Lion shaped legs were used to support the chair.

Double cove chairs were rare in ancient Egypt. One example, likely paid for through tributes or commerce, has legs fashioned like lions and ivory claws. The "shoes" were made of ivory, gold, and gilded bronze. It is set upon gilded bronze drums. This was done to elevate the user, both literally and metaphorically. Ebony, which was rare and valuable in ancient Egypt was used to make the chair. Four wooden stretchers would be docked between the lion legs with dowels. This would be reinforced with gilded bronze. Dowels from each stretcher extended to the seat of the chair, thus reinforcing it.

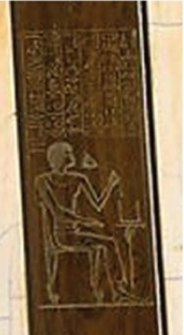
Renseneb's Chair

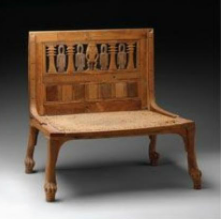
Hatnofer's Chair

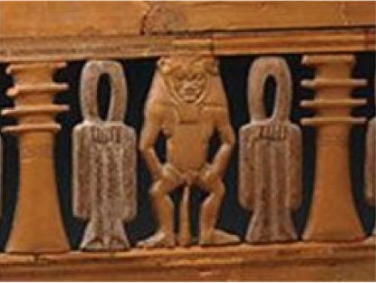
A depiction on the back of Hatnofer's chair. The amulets are on the sides. The pillars on the ends.

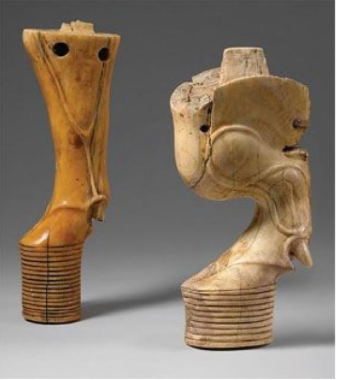
Egyptian Bed or Chair Legs from the New Kingdom. The left one is of a bull, the right is of another animal.

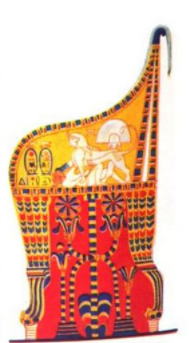
Egyptian Armchair with a cushion hanging over its back

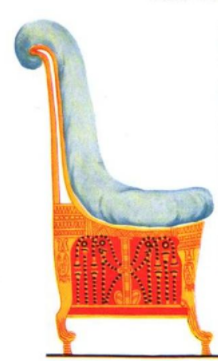
A lion legged Egyptian chair

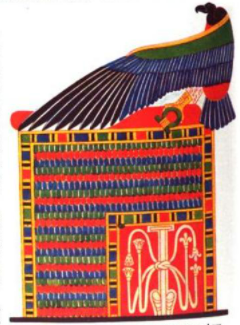
Chair with a box seat and a vulture arm

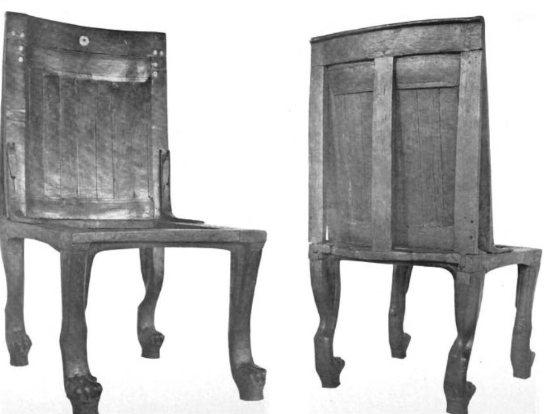
An Egyptian chair, one of the oldest in the world

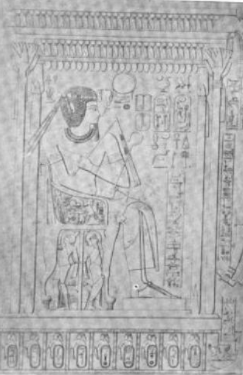
Amenhotep III sitting in a Lion legged chair. (1411-1375 BCE).

===== Chairs from the Tomb of Tutankhamen =====
The chairs from Tutankhamen's tomb were highly decorated with imported ebony and ivory inlay. They were also made for ceremonial purposes. Funerary paraphernalia was common amongst these chairs.

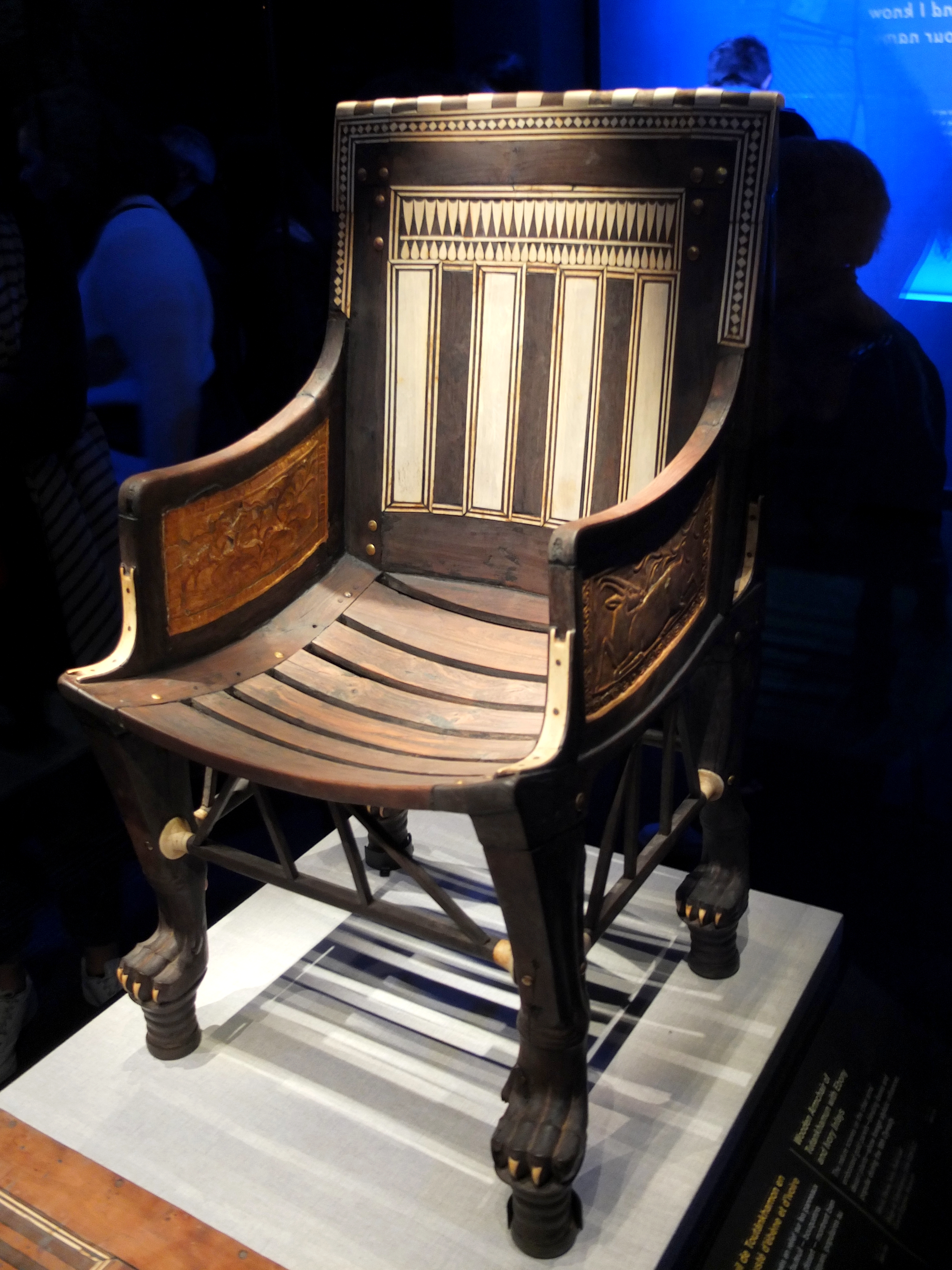
A chair found in Tutankhamen's tomb

A child's chair with lion legs fashioned from wood was found in the Tomb of Tutankhamen atop drums made of bronze and wood. The entire frame of this chair was gessoed. Three vertical members were used to support the back rest. A hawk with partially open wings holding a cartouche of the kings name is depicted on the panel. Another chair found in the Tomb, likely made of cedar wood with feline legs, was placed on a drum that was covered in gold sheet and set upon bronze pads. The claws of the chair are inlaid with ivory. Three gold capped dowels, along with a mortise and tenon were used to pin the legs to the seat. Two cartouches, each being of the Pharaohs name, are on the sides of this symbol. Three carved panels jointed into both the bottom and top rails are used to make the openwork carving on the chair; images of the god Heh holding an ankh and palm stems. Some of these stems are the heads of dowels connected to the elements.

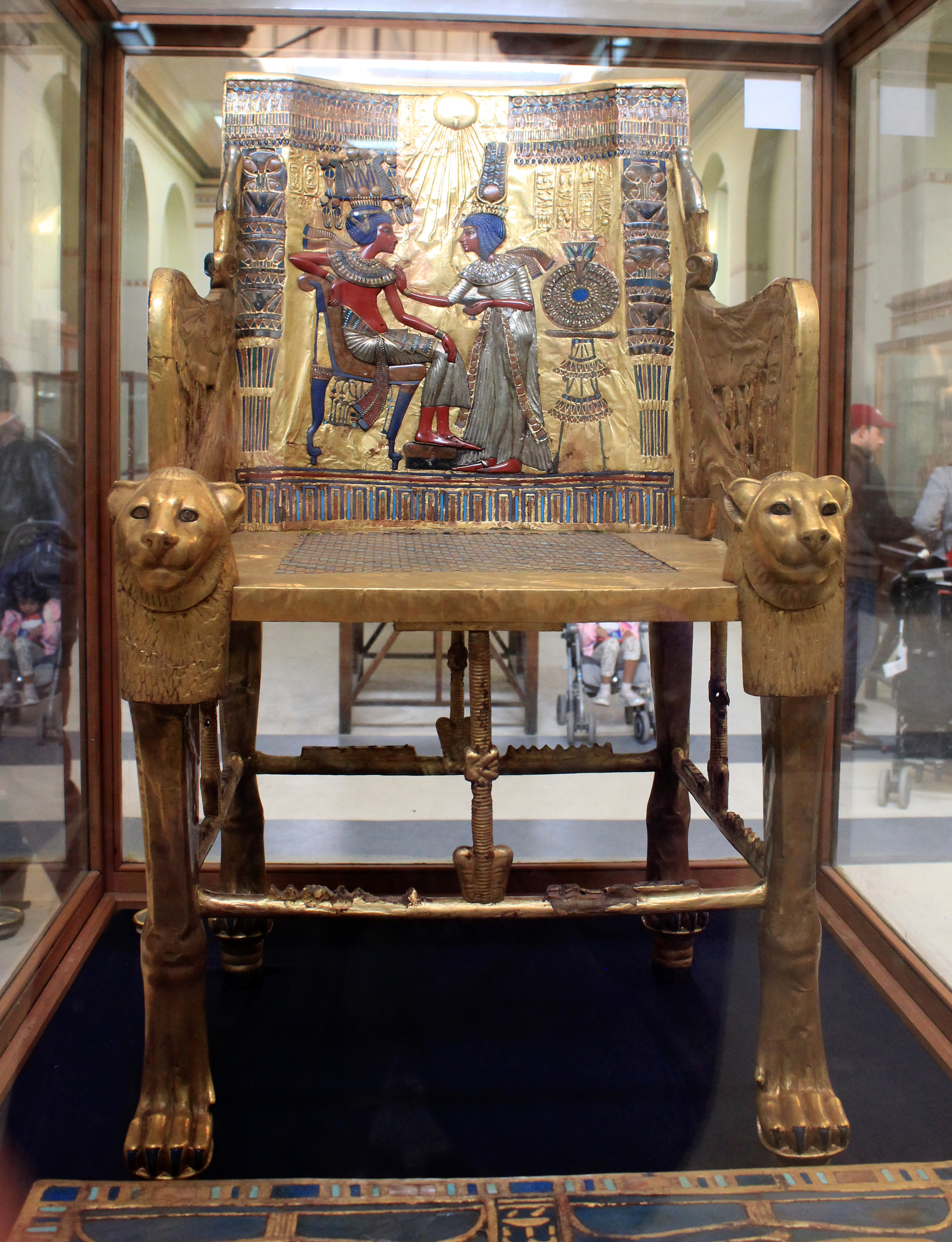
Tutankhamen's throne

A golden chair from Tutankhamen's tomb is covered in gold sheet, while the drum is covered in bronze. Part of the Pschent is depicted in silver on the chair, and turquoise colored glass is used to inlay the claws. Decorative Lower Egyptian papyrus flowers and Upper Egyptian lilly ornaments are beneath the seat, as well as a depiction of the unification of Upper and Lower Egypt. Both of the legs have golden lion's heads as a capital.

=== Stools ===
The majority of people did not have chairs, so stools became a common option for comfortable seating. They were usually made with four legs, a slightly curved seat, and latticework bracing. The most simple ones were made of three legs with a solid, flat, wooden slab seat. Another type of folding stool had crossed legs and a leather fabric seat. This stool used goose and duck heads to form the lower end of the seat. It is likely that this kind of stool was used for personal travel. Three small 18th Dynasty stools have plaited rush seats and short sturdy legs. Such stools, despite being six inches high and a foot square, were employed as seats rather than footstools. Other 18th Dynasty chairs had four slender cylindrical legs with waisted lower parts decorated with bands of incised rings. Light horizontal stretchers found within the legs indicate that all parts of the stool were the same in the three primary dimensions. This chair was made of a dark heavy hardwood, likely tamarisk, and a light softwood, possibly pine. The rushwork seats were made of string mesh and leather. Ceremonial stools would be blocks of stone or wood. If the stool was made out of wood it would have a flint seat. Footstools were made of wood. Stools used by the upper-class would have upward sweeping corners and woven leather seats, with a padded cushion on top. The Royal Footstool had enemies of Egypt painted on the footstool, allowing the Pharaoh to symbolically crush them.

=== Beds ===
Most Egyptians did not use beds, as only the wealthy had access to them. Royal beds were often gilded and richly decorated. Those found in the tombs of Tutankhamen and Hetepheres tended to resemble animals, usually a bull. The beds sloped up towards the head, and down towards the foot. To prevent the sleeper from falling off the bed, there was a wooden footboard. Wood or ivory headrests were used instead of pillows. It is possible that the headrests served ceremonial purposes. Beds were constructed out of wood and had a simple framework that was supported by four legs. To upholster the beds, leather and fabrics were used to support the mattress, with strips being woven into the open holes of the bed frame. A plaited flax cord was lashed to the side of the framework. The flax cords were used in weaving together opposite sides of the framework to form an elastic surface for the user. Also found inside of the tomb of Hetepheres, was a royal canopy. This royal canopy was encased in gold and had curtains hanging from it, used either for privacy or to keep out insects.

Other beds consisted of a simple frame standing on short legs, with a network of lacing to support a mattress pad of folded linen. A typical bed sloped down from head to foot, ending in a vertical footboard. The frame had a series of holes drilled to accommodate the cross lacing that provided the sleeping surface.

Another kind of bed was called a box-bed. These structures were built into the wall and were painted with images of Bes and Taweret demonstrating a fertility function. Some box-beds contain limestone headrests, and a fragment of a female statue. This indicates that the box-bed may have been used for sexual purposes. Another theory is that these beds were used for childbirth. However, this is unlikely, as the beds would not be suitable for the childbirth methods practiced in ancient Egypt.

=== Tables ===
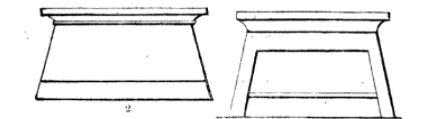
Ancient Egyptian tables. Based on sculptures from Thebes.

The earliest Egyptian tables were carved from stone and made with very low projections to keep the table surface off the ground. Later, in the Old Kingdom, tables would develop longer legs and be braced with a stretcher between them. The most common tables were either round, square, or oblong. Round tables were usually made of a circular flat summit which was supported by a single leg in the center. Some had three legs, and large tables had four legs. Sometimes a figure of a man, usually representative of a captive, was used to support the table instead of legs. Tables were commonly made of wood, willow, or wicker, though some were made of metal or stone. Lightweight tables could be made of reeds. Tables were used for both dining and games. A game called Mehen would be played on a one-legged table carved into or inlaid with the shape of a snake. The Egyptians also had offering tables made of stone which would be placed in home shrines or tombs.

=== Chests ===
Chests were used to store household and personal objects and varied in size. They were almost exclusively rectangular boxes with flat, gabled, domed, or shrine-shaped lids and mushroom-shaped knobs. Some of these were sliding lids, some were hinged, and some simply rested atop the chest or fit into grooves. It was common for chests to have short legs, but many did not have legs, and a few had tall legs. The insides of some chests were divided into compartments and some had cavetto cornices. Decoration ranged from plain chests gessoed or painted white to the elaborate painted, carved, gilded, and inlaid scenes and patterns on royal chests.

=== Materials ===
Wood was a common material used in furniture production despite its scarcity. The woods native to Egypt were incredibly rare and of inferior quality to woods imported from elsewhere. The most common types of wood were sycamore, elm, date palm, poplar, turkey oak, spruce, olive wood, walnut, oak, sidr, ash, cypress, acacia, box, chestnut and tamarisk. Maple, beech, and cherry were also used. However, their usage was far more limited than the other woods. Carob, figs, doum palm, and persea may have also been used. Hardwoods such as cedar, juniper, and ebony were also used. Some woods were imported from Syria and Lebanon, such as cedar, fir, pine, yew, and possibly birch. Timber would have been imported from other nations as well. Large pieces of timber were tied to an upward post, and they were cut downwards with short saws.

==== Common woods ====
Acacia was one of the most common woods used to make furniture in the ancient Near East. Egypt primarily imported it from Nubia. This wood was not unique to Nubia, it existed throughout much of the Middle East. Acacia was not the only common wood in Egypt. Cypress wood, Lebanese cedar, Cedrus libanotica, and Cedrus atlantica were all common and popular woods in ancient Egypt. Cedar wood had a variety of different ways to be cultivated. Lebanese cedar and Cedrus libanotica were all imported from Syria. Cedrus atlantica was imported from Lebanon and the Atlas Mountains. Some cedar wood was grown in Egypt. This wood was unlike other woods in the sense that it was desired by the ancient Egyptians because of its pleasant smell, rather than its usage in craftsmanship. This does not mean it was useless. It could be used to make monumental doors, ship masts, structural beams, furniture, and statues. Some pieces of cedar measured as long as 30 cubits. Cypress wood became popular in Egypt quickly. It was already widespread by the Predynastic Period. Short planks of wood were used in ancient Egypt. They needed to be left to dry before being used to avoid problems that might arise from the contraction of the wood. Ash wood was a wood was used to make furniture which was supposed to last an eternity. Ash wood was utilized due to the fact that it was perishable. Making it last a long time. This wood was used for rounded designs, as was suited for carving. Other goods were produced using ash wood. Such as handles, joinery, coverings, carving projects, bows, arrows, and small furniture. To construct boxes, furniture, musical instruments, knives, bows, and arrows sycamore wood was used. Small furniture and delicate objects were created using olive wood. Olive wood was also one of the most common types in ancient Egypt. Chariot wheels, spokes, dowels and joints were created using tamarisk. Dowels, inserts, roof shingles, ladder rungs, or veneer was made using Turkey Oak. When this wood was used to make curved elements, it would be heated and bent. Sometimes carpenters would use naturally curved pieces of wood would be used. Turkey oak grew around Thebes. This wood was valued by the Egyptians. An inscription from the time of Thutmose III, called it "one of the good, sweet woods of god's land." Dowels, boat parts, and plywood coffins were made of Sidder. Beds, tables, and other kinds of furniture, joints, inserts, and support parts were made of Persea wood. This wood was cultivated by the Egyptians through sustenance. Elm wood was mostly used to make chariots. It was imported to Egypt from the Balkans, Turkey, and Iran. Dom palm was the preferred kind of palm in ancient Egypt. This was due to its hardness and compactness.

==== Rare Woods ====
Ebony was one of the rarest valuable kinds of wood in ancient Egypt. The Egyptian aristocracy ensured it was constantly being imported from Kush and Punt. This wood was primarily used to create chests, statues, musical instruments, tables, chairs, beds, and footstools for the royals and upper elite. Ebony was used since the First Dynasty. Despite this, it became far more popular in the New Kingdom. The honor of being a prestigious wood was not exclusive to ebony. Birch was also rare and valuable. It was so rare, only a few samples of anything made from birch have been found. This kind of wood was probably brought to Egypt by travelers visiting Persia. Pine was also rare in Egypt. It was imported to Egypt from Syro-Palestine. After being imported to Egypt it was used to make chariots during the 18th Dynasty. One of the most precious woods in Egypt was walnut wood. This wood was imported from the Mediterranean Coast, and it was mainly used as a veneer. Juniper was a wood used since the Third Dynasty. This wood was popular amongst the Egyptian royalty, and it was used to make roof timbers, coffins, wagons, frames, and tenon joints. From the Middle Kingdom to the Ptolemaic Kingdom boxwood was used for inlays, tables, sculptures, turned items, tool handles, and beds. Boxwood was suitable for larger structures due to its weight and strength. This wood was imported from the mountains of Lebanon.

==== Acquisition ====
===== Trade outposts and routes =====
Egypt had trade outposts spread throughout the Levant. Cities like Byblos were very important to the Egyptian economy. This city stood at the heart of Egypt's trade routes. Trade between Egypt and Byblos began in the 3rd Dynasty. Furniture would be exported to Byblos, and in return Egypt would import wood. Byblos was important, but it was not the only way of acquiring wood. After the First Intermediate Period Egypt lost influence over certain parts of the world. For example, Egypt had no military presence in the Levant, instead Egypt dominated the area economically. Egypt had so much economic influence in the Levant, that it was a common sight to see ships filled with wood traveling between Egypt and Syria. Ugarit replaced Byblos during the New Kingdom. Ugarit would export copper and boxwood to Egypt, in return for furniture. Ugarit was so important to Egyptian trade that there were Egyptian merchants permanently stationed in Ugarit to ensure the demand for wood was meant. Sidon and Tyre were also important trade outposts. They ascended to importance during the Third Intermediate Period. Trade routes developed due to urbanization. This exposed many civilizations to a greater variety of materials. After the Late Bronze Age collapse these trade routes collapsed, resulting in less luxurious furniture. The wood trade was very important in Egypt. It was responsible for the prevalence of the furniture industry as native Egyptian wood was poor and scarce. As a result, the pharaoh had a lot of control of the trade. Only the pharaoh could order trees to be cut down, he needed to grant permission to plant trees, and he had a personal fleet of ships which could trade. Despite all this, it was difficult to secure trade deals.

===== Furniture trade =====
As trade routes developed timber became increasingly more valued. It was so valuable that the goods would only be loaded onto ships once they had already been paid for. The woods that were the most common to trade were oak, pine, cypress, fir, and juniper. Some woods, like cedar, began to be imported during the Early Dynastic period. Others began to be imported later. Fir, pine, and juniper began being imported from Phoenicia in 2650 BCE. Trade relations between Lower and Upper Egypt existed around 3100 BCE. Egypt traded with other nations around 3300 2200 BCE. During the Fourth Dynasty, Syrian elm and ash timber, sycamore-fig wood, and Lebanese cedar began to be imported from Syria. Other places that wood could be imported from was the Eastern Taurus, Lebanon, Anti-Lebanon, Amanus, Anti-Taurus, Pontus, and Zagros Mountains. The best wood came from Cyprus, Macedonia, Thrace, and Italy. Egypt imported most of its coastal regions and mountains of Anatolia and Lebanon. Imported wood was more durable, which likely spurred the development of more grandiose buildings. Materials like lapis lazuli were mined. Many industries used this material; however, the furniture industry specifically used it to create exquisite furniture, which would then be exported to other nations. Metal like ivory, copper, wickerwork, glass beads, gold, silver, turquoise, malachite and stone were used to decorate furniture, resulting in furniture that was either blue, green, or polychrome. These materials would not just be imported from other countries, but they would also be exported back to those countries. This trade was so important that pharaohs would be gifted tin, copper, lapis lazuli, silver, and precious wood at their coronation. Such a practice became especially prevalent in the New Kingdom. Among the most important of these materials was bronze. It was introduced in the Middle Kingdom in the form of ingots and adopted due to its multifarious uses. This metal was used to make armrests, backrests, and side-panels for seats. Bronze tools had been in use since 2000 BCE, but eventually its role was largely replaced by iron, which was introduced to Egypt through the Hyksos. Wrought iron, being stronger and stiffer, started to be preferred for the creation of furniture over bronze.

===== Conquest =====
In times of conflict, wood becomes a scarce resource, and felling an enemy's trees can become a military objective. Ancient wars were often waged to gather resources. Thutmose III campaigned in Lebanon to gather cedar wood. For the coronation of a new pharaoh, ready-cut wood along with other metals would be sent by other nations as a gift, highly valuable due to the scarcity of wood in Egypt. Many nations would send these gifts, especially during the New Kingdom, when Egypt was one of the world's superpowers.

=== Tools and manufacturing ===
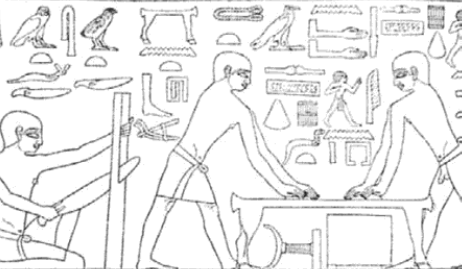
Egyptian carpenters making furniture

==== Saws ====
In ancient Egypt, the first occurrence of saws were saw-knives with curved edges, teeth on one side of the blade, and rounded blunt noses. These originated from the earliest parts of Egyptian history. However, as the material conditions of Egyptian carpenters improved, so did the tools. Sometime between 4500 and 4400 BCE during the First Dynasty, flint saws and knives were replaced with copper tools. Also in the first dynasty, the pull-saw was introduced. This saw was thin bladed with uncanted teeth. Unlike other saws, the teeth of the saw face in the direction of the handle and do not extend over the entire length of the blade. Pull-saws had increased accuracy, provided greater ease of movement, made cutting large timber logs easier, and had superior workability. This was done through the unique knob on the handle. The knob was downward turned on the handle. Some of these benefits resulted from how the saw was pulled instead of pushed. While manufacturing goods the carpenter's free hand was needed to secure the furniture. This led to the saws used to cut designs or joints usually being one handed. Two-handed saws allowed the carpenter to put his bodyweight behind the thrusting action. Sturdy frames, wedges, tourniquets, and weights were used to support the beam. Beams would have their edges beaten out and their teeth punched out. The edges were beaten out because this added hardness and durability. It was not an uncommon result for the teeth to be flat blunted, or irregular in shape and pitch. During the production of saw blades, wedges were needed to prevent the blade from jamming in the resinous kerf. Such an event could leave marks on the worked surface of the wood.

==== Adzes ====
Before the Predynastic Period flint was used to make adzes. Other early adzes had rounded heads with straight sides and a ridge below. Later, during the predynastic period, copper was used instead. This was not the only change; the new adzes became more rounded, and side lungs were added. Other design features remained. Adzes were still hammered into a flat shape, some still had dual cutting edges or only one sharpened edge. These newer adzes were lashed to wood handles. This would allow them to plane and trim surfaces. To attach the flat blades to these tools, an L-shaped head was used. The head also provided a cutting angle which made for easier downward scraping or chopping. Any cuts would be made perpendicular to the handle. Once finished, this tool would resemble a T-shape. Other tools resembled swan's necks or candy canes. Each served adze had a different purpose. T-shaped adzes were used to shape angles, swan neck adzes would carve horizontal beams. Another kind of adze, called a modified candy cane adze was used to flatten large surfaces. This other kind of adze had a rigid neck and four rectangular angles. While using the T-shaped adze, the carpenter could be positioned at manty different angles. Adzes from the First Dynasty of Egypt became larger, as they were intended for large furniture. Adzes from this point onwards had a flared body combined with a straight cutting edge. Although, over the course of time the tools did become more necked below the blade's head until the neck was one fifth the size of the cutting edge. While large tools underwent a history of redesigns and changes, smaller adzes remained constant since the Predynastic Period. Such small adzes were used for delicate work, such as carving furniture legs.

==== Sharpening and honing instruments ====
The first sharpening and honing instruments were made of copper. These tools were present throughout all of ancient Egyptian history, as this equipment was needed to sharpen all materials, no matter how advanced. Slate allowed the carpenter to use both hands whilst sharpening. This would be done by forcing the slate to hang vertically by suspending it to a stone attached to a hole. This hole was drilled into the thickest end of the furniture. Small quantities of oil were used to lubricate the tool and the stone. This provided the carpenter a smooth workable surface. Another side effect was that after continued usage the slate would narrow towards the piece of furniture's center

==== Furniture manufacturing tools ====
Before making or gathering the wood, a cubit rod was used to take measurements of the wood. Another tool used to take measurements. This tool was triangular, and was it made by using gravity to align a plumb bob to a centered marking on the device's frame. This plumb bob was weighed down by a line. To use this tool properly, the wood needed to be affixed to support frames. Only slight adjustments needed to be made to the wood. These slight adjustments were done to give the carpenter a level cutting surface. If a carpenter needed guidance on where and how to cut or measure the wood, try squares and cutting aids would be used.

==== Drills and bow drills ====
Bow drills were initially used to start fires. The tool in this stage was made from a cord strung between two ends of a curved wooden bow. This tool needs to be wrapped around a drill shaft, which meant enough slack needed to be left in the cord so this could be done. A rotating device would be kept in balance by a stone cup held at the top of the drill-shaft. Weight would be applied to the stone cup by the user, allowing the drill to penetrate the wood. This part of its history was ended when people realized it was suited for boring holes. By the time of the Old Kingdom, bow drills were already a common tool. It was regularly used during the 5th Dynasty. The holes it made would allow the insertion of dowel joints. Dowel joints were used to fasten rawhide lacings, woven rush seats, woven seats, or lashings. Minute holes would be created by a different tool, the bradawl. This tool would drill through thin sheets of wood or other materials. Egyptian bradawls would have utilized pressure applied to its wood surface to drill these holes. This also allowed it to function without a mullet. Another use for the bradawl was to indicate where the bow drill should be used to drill holes.

==== Manufacturing process ====
The most useful kind of wood would have come from a tree with straight trunks, sufficient heartwood, and no defects. Before using manufacturing furniture or anything out of this wood, first axes needed to be used to cut down the tree. The lumberjacks would start by cutting down the bottom of the tree. Several other men would catch the rest of the tree after it fell. Once this part of the process had been completed, a new stage would start. After branches, sapwood, and bark were removed, the logs would be cut into smaller and more manageable boards. To achieve this, the boards would cleave with mallets and wedges. Saws were used to cut shorter logs that were vertically secured to posts. Egyptians would have cut through logs using a method called through and through cutting. Also, the wood needed to properly be positioned and created. If this was not done the climate of Egypt would cause problems for the furniture and material. The wood needed to be kept away from sunlight as this might result in unwanted drying. Fitting lids, firm joints, and unwarped boards of furniture were used to season the timber. This was because other forms required more advanced tools. Once this process was completed, the beams were placed on a simple lumber stack. This allowed for natural air drying. Sometimes this resulted in microbial organisms growing, causing the material to decay. Other times the material simply changed shape. Whilst cutting, logs would be strapped to a trestle. This trestle supported the log by using a horizontal beam held up by two splayed legs. This was done to make cutting logs safer for the workers.

=== Religious significance ===
Religion and furniture were linked in ancient Egypt. Aside from the fact that the reason for the preservation of so much furniture is the Egyptian belief in life after death; decorations and ornaments in ancient Egyptian furniture were often for religious purposes. The decorations would be carefully chosen based on their religious significance and their aesthetic appeal. Wood was an important material not just structurally, but also religiously. The material was connected to gods and goddesses through those deities associations with forests. Forests represented the homes of the gods and they stood as natural places of worship. It was believed that certain gods and goddesses preferred different types of wood. It was also believed that certain kinds of wood were sacred, and therefore had limited usage. Temples controlled the trade required to gather materials used to make furniture, and they could regulate the craftsmanship required to create furniture.

== Dilmun ==
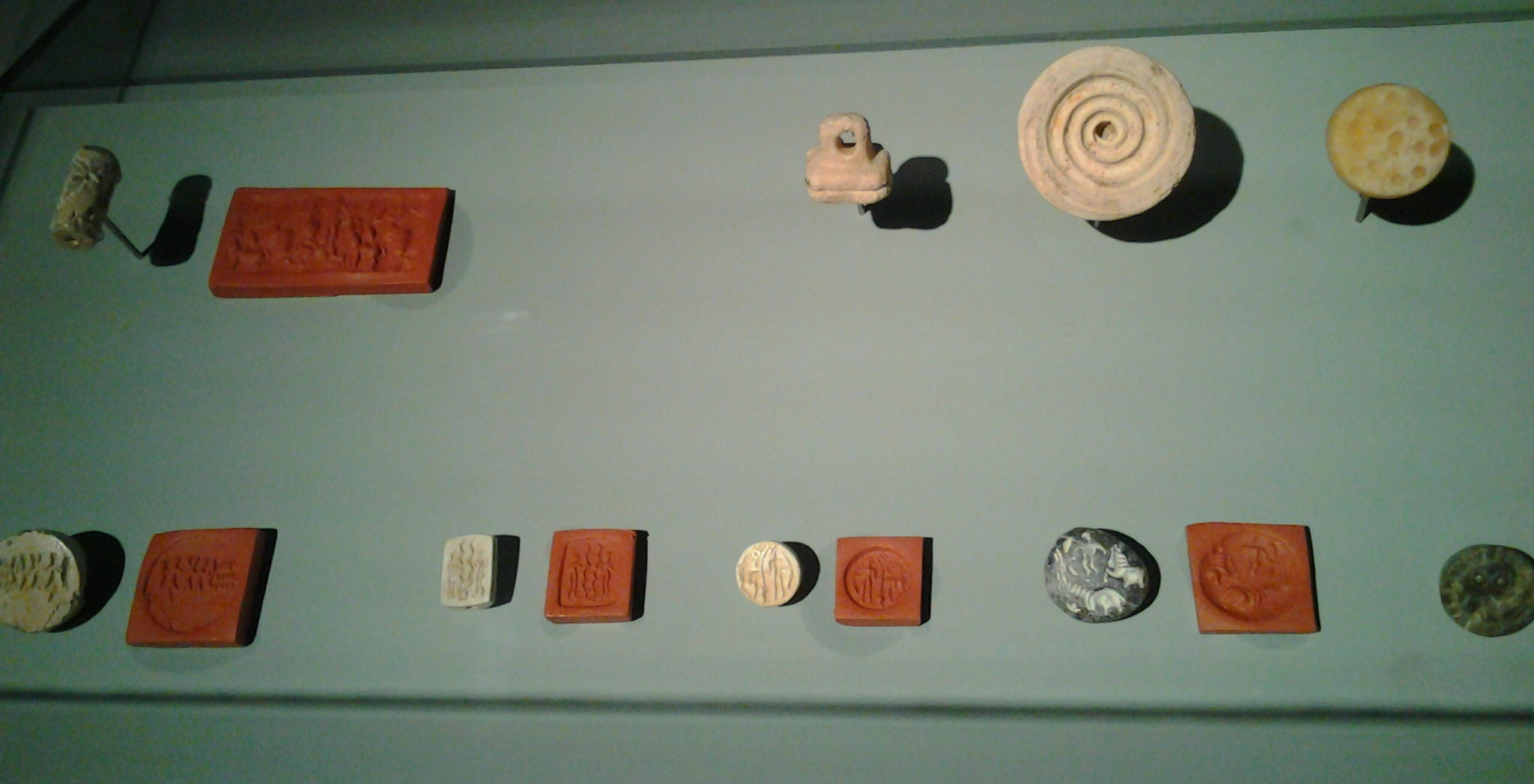
Seals from Dilmun

Because no Dilmunite furniture survives, archaeologists and historians are forced to rely on Dilmunite seals. These seals, which are primarily from Bahrain and Failaka, show a side view of furniture, leaving the dimensions of the furniture ambiguous. Thus historians have to rely on the dimensions of furniture in other civilizations to imagine what furniture in Dilmun looked like.

Chairs and thrones would have been built out of Shorea wood. Dowels would have been used for mortise and tenon joints. Sharp chisels would carve hardwood into furniture. Turpentine was used to thin animal fat, wax, and honey to finish the wood. Glue may have been used in the construction of furniture. Posts would penetrate the seat of the chair. Chairs had backs fixed to the lower frame of the seat. At the top of the back support of some chairs, there was a sphere with horns imitating a goat's or bull's head. In some seals, chairs are depicted with seats shaped like boxes.

The chairs would have been 90 cm high; the seat and the back support would have been 45 cm (18 inches) high. The diameter of the back is 8 cm or 3 inches. The width of the seat is 70 cm (27 in), the depth of the seat is 50 cm (20 in). The legs were 5 cm by 5 cm (2 in by 2 in) or 10 cm by 5 cm (4 in by 2 in).

The seals depict thrones with stools in front of them. Kings, important officials, and wealthy people would have used these thrones. One seal depicts a throne with vertical back support and front legs. Another seal depicts a similar throne but with a rectangular frame base. Stools in Dilmun are well built and are similar to thrones. However, they have no back support. Stools would have been well decorated if they were used by gods, kings, officials, and rich people.

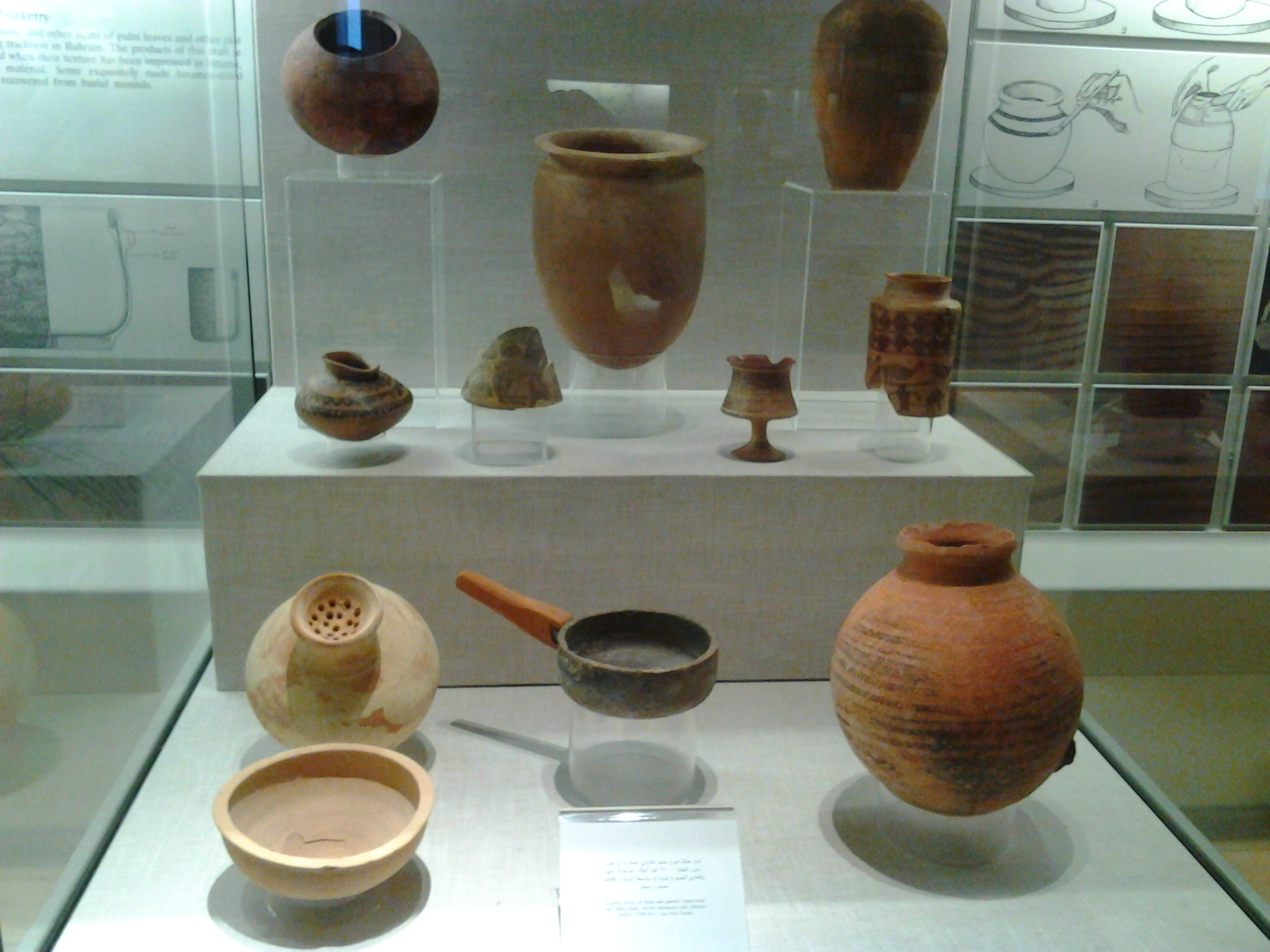
Dilmunite pottery

Very few tables have been depicted in seals from Dilmun. All of these tables are ceremonial. Dilmunite tables had a concave or crescent top sitting on a column that divides into three curved legs with bull's hooves. Such tables may have been used for trade.

Rectangular hatched altars would be used for sacrificing items and animals to the Dilmunite gods. The tabletop of the altar is concave. Spikes would stick out of a column. The legs of the altar end in animal hooves. The column and legs may be one piece, with the concave top joining the piece. Some altars looked like double boxes.

Although very rarely a complete vase, archaeology has resulted in pottery from the Dilmunite city of Qal'at al Bahrain being unearthed. There were two styles of pottery, "Barbar" and "Eastern." Sanctuaries would be filled with small figurines. Most of these figurines were of a bearded horseman holding a mount without reigns. Other figurines depicted hybrids between animals and people. Inside ancient Dilmunite houses storage jars, painted pots, fine chisels, and copper have been found.

Decorations for the furniture would have been borrowed from other civilizations.

== Greece ==
Ancient Greek furniture was typically constructed out of wood, though it might also be made of stone or metal, such as bronze, iron, gold, and silver. Little wood survives from ancient Greece, though varieties mentioned in texts concerning Greece and Rome include maple, oak, beech, yew, and willow. Pieces were assembled using mortise-and-tenon joinery, held together with lashings, pegs, metal nails, and glue. Wood was shaped by carving, steam treatment, the lathe, and furniture is known to have been decorated with ivory, tortoise shell, glass, gold, or other precious materials. Similarly, furniture could be veneered with expensive types of wood to make the object appear more costly, though classical furniture was often pared down in comparison to objects attested in the East, or those from earlier periods in Greece.

Extensive research was done on the forms of Greek furniture by Gisela Richter, who utilized a typological approach based primarily on illustrated examples depicted in Greek art, and it is from Richter's account that the main types can be delineated.

=== Seating ===
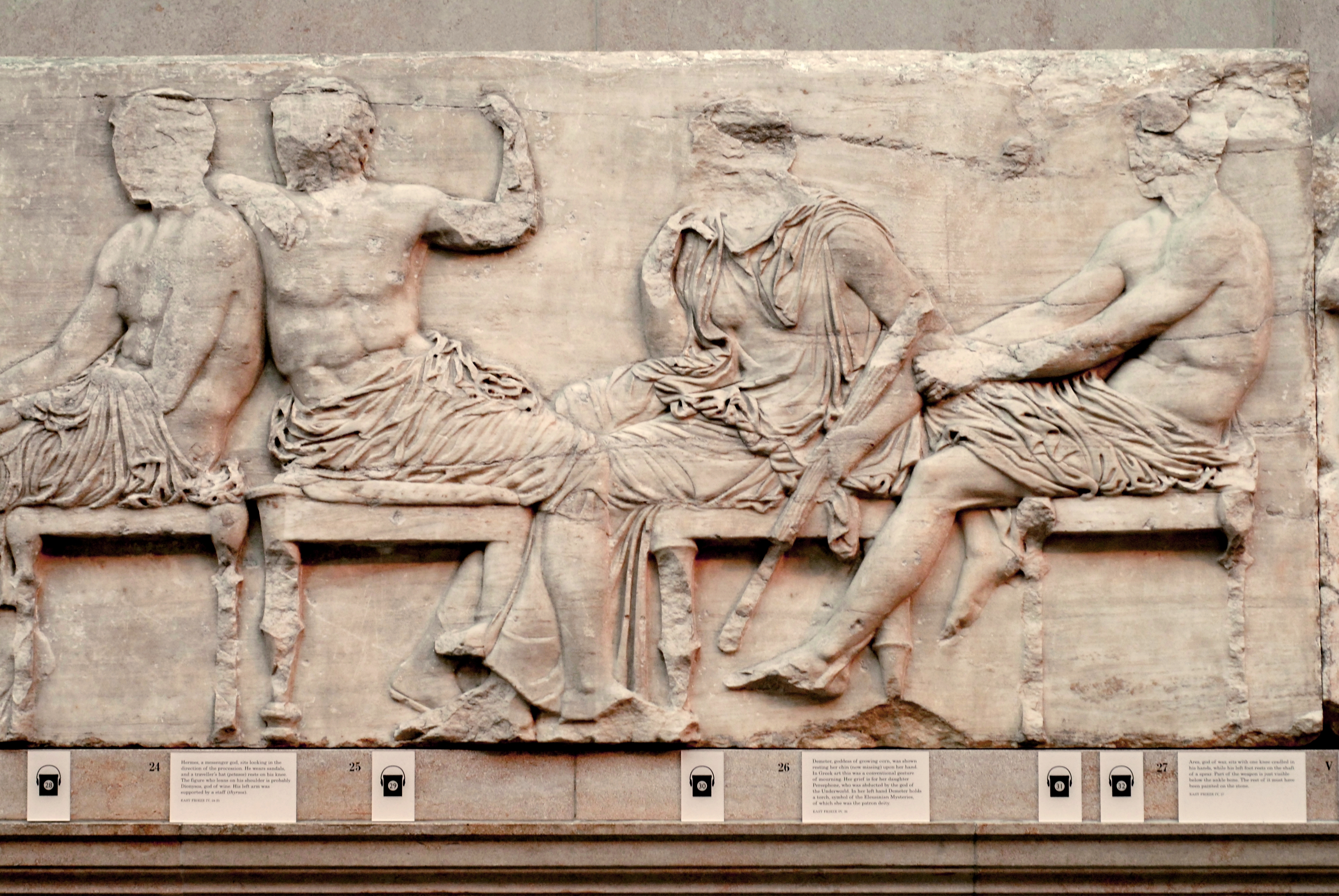
Block IV from the east frieze of the Parthenon, with images of seated gods, ca. 447–433 BCE

The modern word "throne" is derived from the ancient Greek thronos (Greek singular: θρόνος), which was a seat designated for deities or individuals of high status or honor. The colossal chryselephantine statue of Zeus at Olympia, constructed by Phidias and lost in antiquity, featured the god Zeus seated on an elaborate throne, which was decorated with gold, precious stones, ebony, and ivory, according to Pausanias. Less extravagant though more influential in later periods is the klismos (Greek singular: κλισμός), an elegant Greek chair with a curved backrest and legs whose form was copied by the Romans and is now part of the vocabulary of furniture design. A fine example is shown on the grave stele of Hegeso, dating to the late fifth century BCE. As with earlier furniture from the east, the klismos and thronos could be accompanied by footstools. There are three types of footstools outlined by Richter – those with plain straight legs, those with curved legs, and those shaped like boxes that would have sat directly on the ground.

The most common form of Greek seat was the backless stool. These were known as diphroi (Greek singular: δίφρος) and they were easily portable. The Parthenon frieze displays numerous examples, upon which the gods are seated. Several fragments of a stool were discovered in the fourth-century BCE. tomb in Thessaloniki, including two of the legs and four transverse stretchers. Once made of wood and covered in silver foil, all that remains of this piece are the parts made of precious metal.

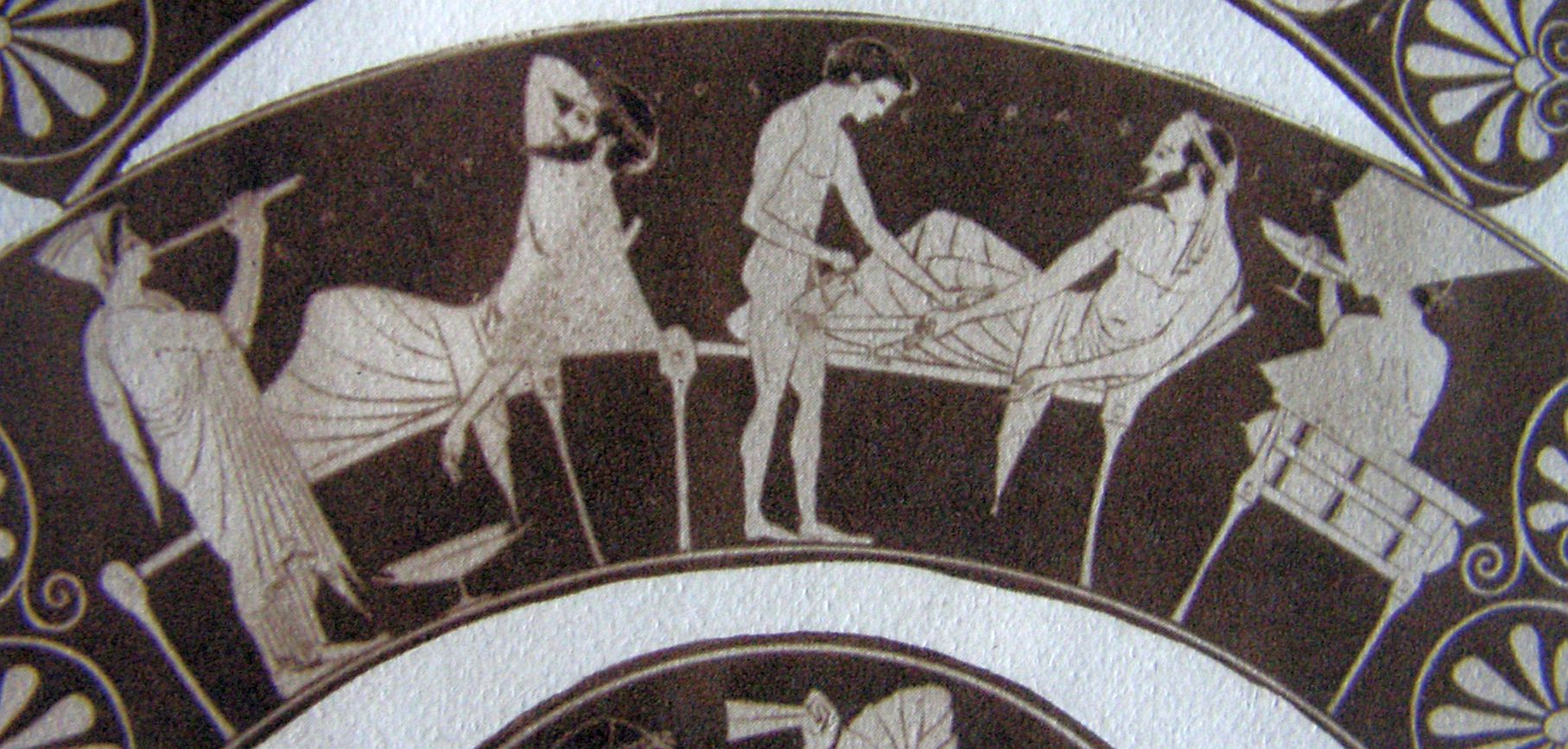
A Greek symposium

The folding stool, known as the diphros okladias (Greek singular: δίφρος ὀκλαδίας), was practical and portable. The Greek folding stool survives in numerous depictions, indicating its popularity in the Archaic and Classical periods; the type may have been derived from earlier Minoan and Mycenaean examples, which in turn were likely based on Egyptian models. Greek folding stools might have plain straight legs or curved legs that typically ended in animal feet.

=== Klinai ===
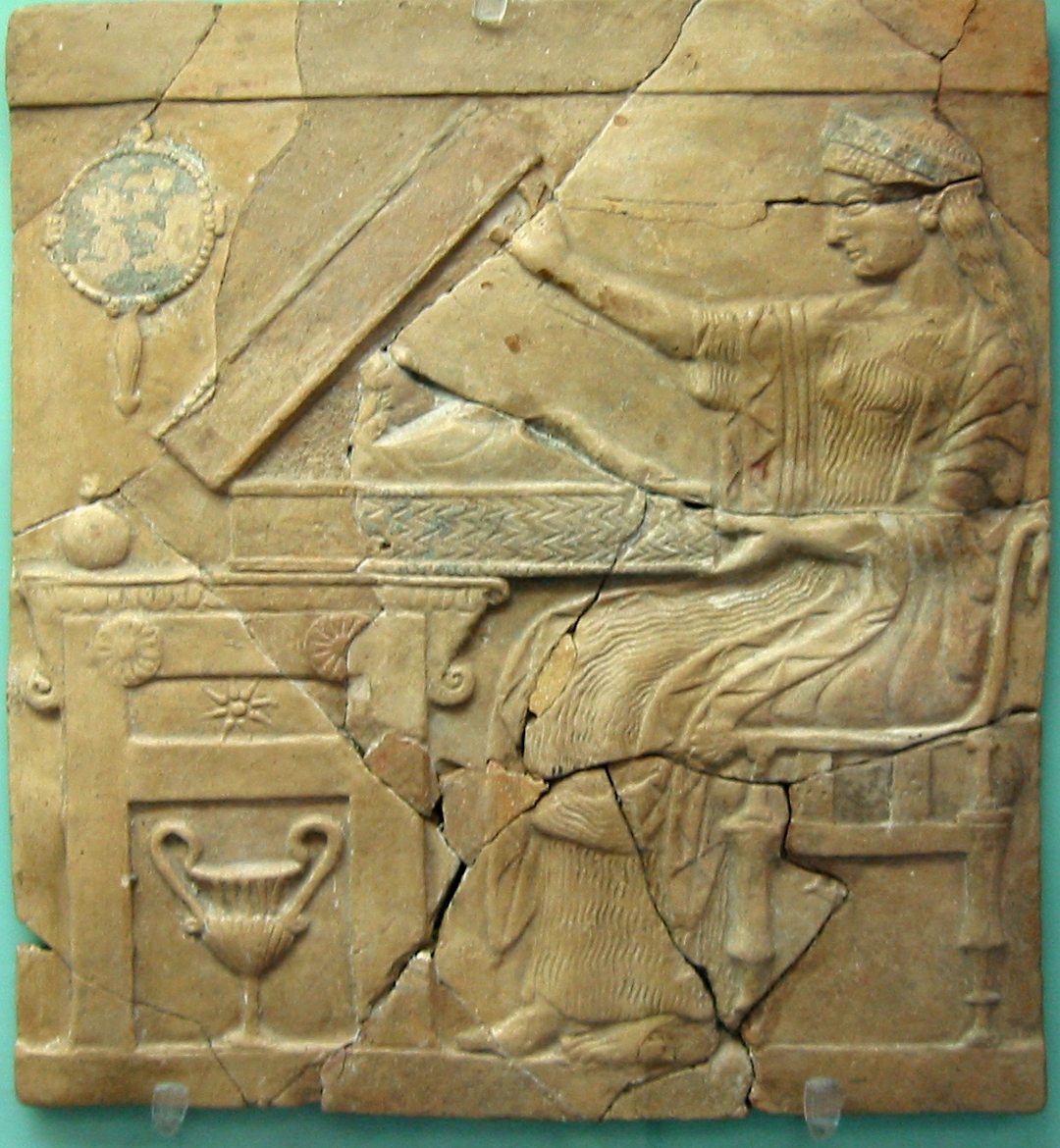
Relief with Persephone

A couch or kline (Greek: κλίνη) was a form used in Greece as early as the late seventh century B.C.E. The kline was rectangular and supported on four legs, two of which could be longer than the other, providing support for an armrest or headboard. Three types are distinguished by Richter – those with animal legs, those with "turned" legs, and those with "rectangular" legs, although this terminology is somewhat problematic. The fabric would have been draped over the woven platform of the couch, and cushions would have been placed against the arm or headrest, making the Greek couch an item well suited for a symposium gathering. The foot of a bronze bed discovered in situ in the House of the Seals at Delos indicate how the "turned" legs of a kline might have appeared. Numerous images of klinai are displayed on vases, topped by layers of intricately woven fabrics and pillows. These furnishings would have been made of leather, wool, or linen, though silk could also have been used. Stuffing for pillows, cushions, and beds could have been made of wool, feathers, leaves, or hay.

=== Tables ===
In general, Greek tables (Greek singular: τράπεζα, τρἰπους, τετράπους, φάτνη, ὲλεóς) were low and often appear in depictions alongside klinai and could perhaps fit underneath. The most common type of Greek table had a rectangular top supported on three legs, though numerous configurations exist. Tables could have circular tops, and four legs or even one central leg instead of three. Tables in ancient Greece were used mostly for dining purposes – in depictions of banquets, it appears as though each participant would have utilized a single table, rather than a collective use of a larger piece. On such occasions, tables would have been moved according to one's needs.

Tables also would have figured prominently in religious contexts, as indicated in vase paintings. One example by the Chicago Painter from The Art Institute of Chicago, dating to around 450 B.C.E., shows an image of three women performing a Dionysian ritual, in which a table functions as an appropriate place to rest a kantharos – a wine vessel associated with Dionysus. Other images indicate that tables could range in style from the highly ornate to the relatively unadorned.

== Rome ==
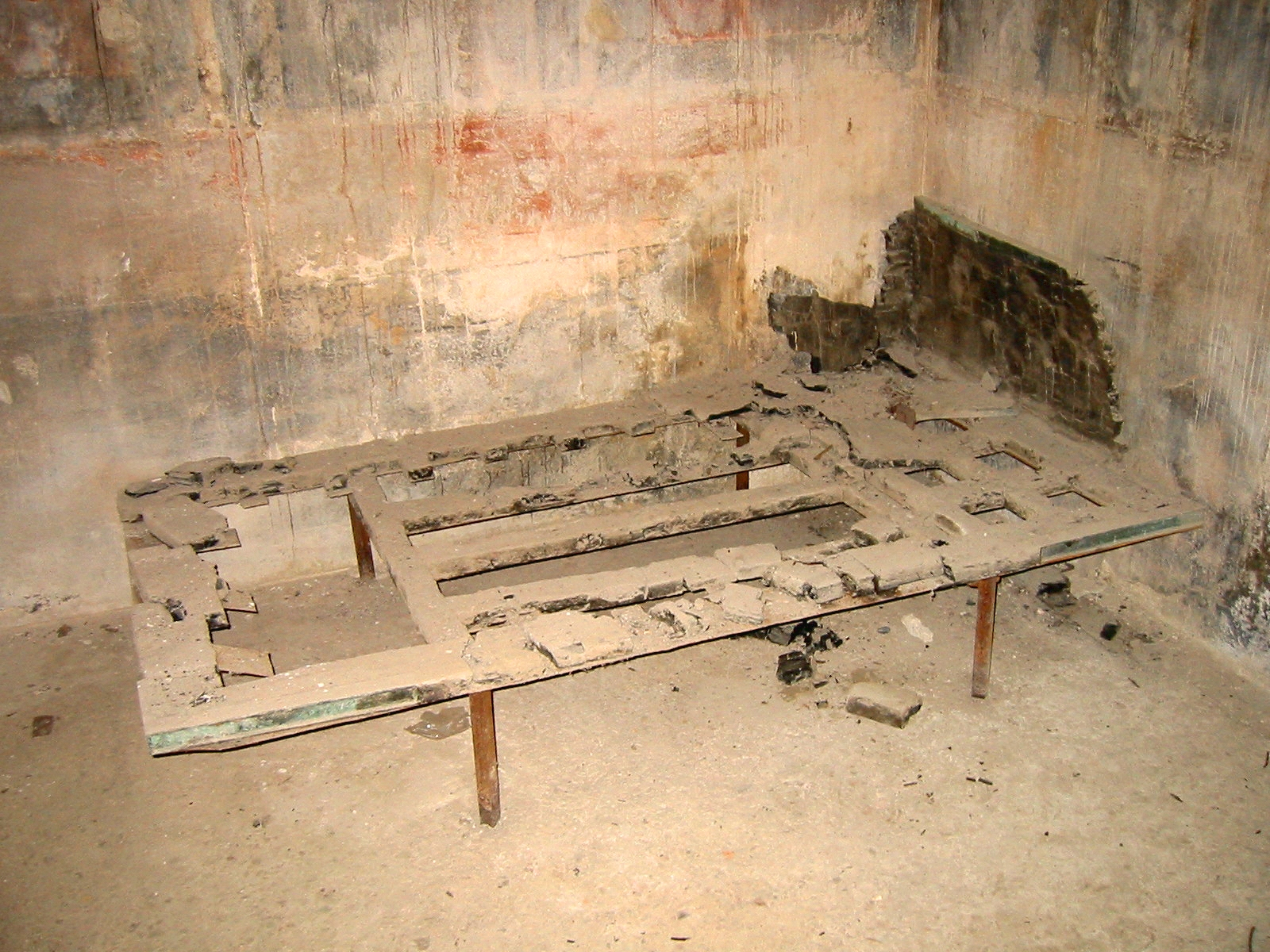
Carbonized bed from the Casa del Tramezzo di Legno in Herculaneum

To a large extent, the types and styles of ancient Roman furniture followed those of their Classical and Hellenistic Greek predecessors. Because of this, it is difficult to differentiate Roman forms from earlier Hellenistic ones in many cases. Gisela Richter's typological approach is useful in tracing developments of Greek furniture into Roman expressions. Knowledge of Roman furniture is derived mainly from depictions in frescoes and representations in sculpture, along with actual pieces of furniture, fragments, and fittings, several of which were preserved by the eruption of Vesuvius in AD 79. The most well-known archaeological sites with preserved images and fragments from the eruption are Pompeii and Herculaneum in Italy. There are fine examples of reconstructed Roman furniture at the Metropolitan Museum of Art in New York City as well as the Capitoline Museum in Rome.

=== Chairs ===
The sella, or stool or chair, was the most common type of seating in the Roman period, probably because of its easy portability. The sella in its simplest form was inexpensive to make. Both slaves and emperors used it, although those of the poor were plain, while the wealthy had access to precious woods, ornamented with inlay, metal fittings, ivory, and silver and gold leaf. Bronze sellae from Herculaneum were squares and had straight legs, decorative stretchers, and a dished seat. The sella curulis, or folding stool, was an important indicator of power in the Roman period. There were sellae resembling both stools and chairs that folded in a scissor fashion to facilitate transport.

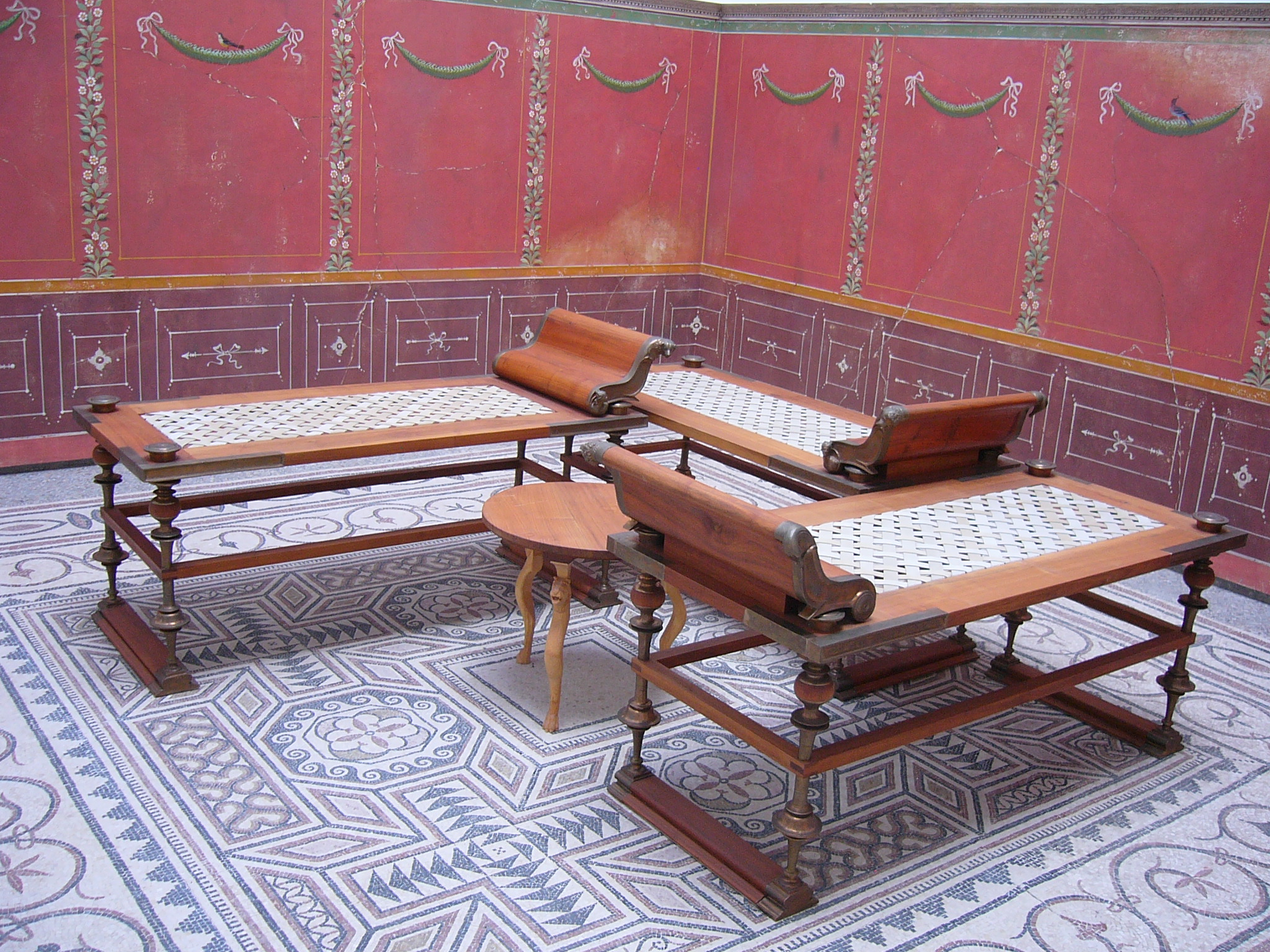
Reconstructed triclinium or dining room, with three klinai or couches

The Roman cathedra was a chair with a back, although there is disagreement as to the exact meaning of the Latin term. Richter defines the cathedra as a later version of the Greek klismos, which she says was never as popular as its Greek predecessor. A. T. Croom, however, considers the cathedra to be a high-backed wickerwork chair that was typically associated with women. They have also been seen being used as early school teachers, pupils would sit around him in this chair while he taught. It showed who held the seat of power in the classroom. As with Greek furniture, the names of various Roman types as found in texts cannot always be associated with known furniture forms with certainty.

The Latin solium is considered to be equivalent to the Greek term thronos and thus is often translated as "throne". These were like modern chairs, with backs and armrests. Three types of solia based on Greek prototypes are distinguished by Richter: thrones with "turned" and "rectangular" legs and grandiose thrones with solid sides, of which several examples remain in stone. Also, a type with a high back and arms, resting upon a cylindrical or conical base, is said to derive from Etruscan prototypes.

=== Couches ===
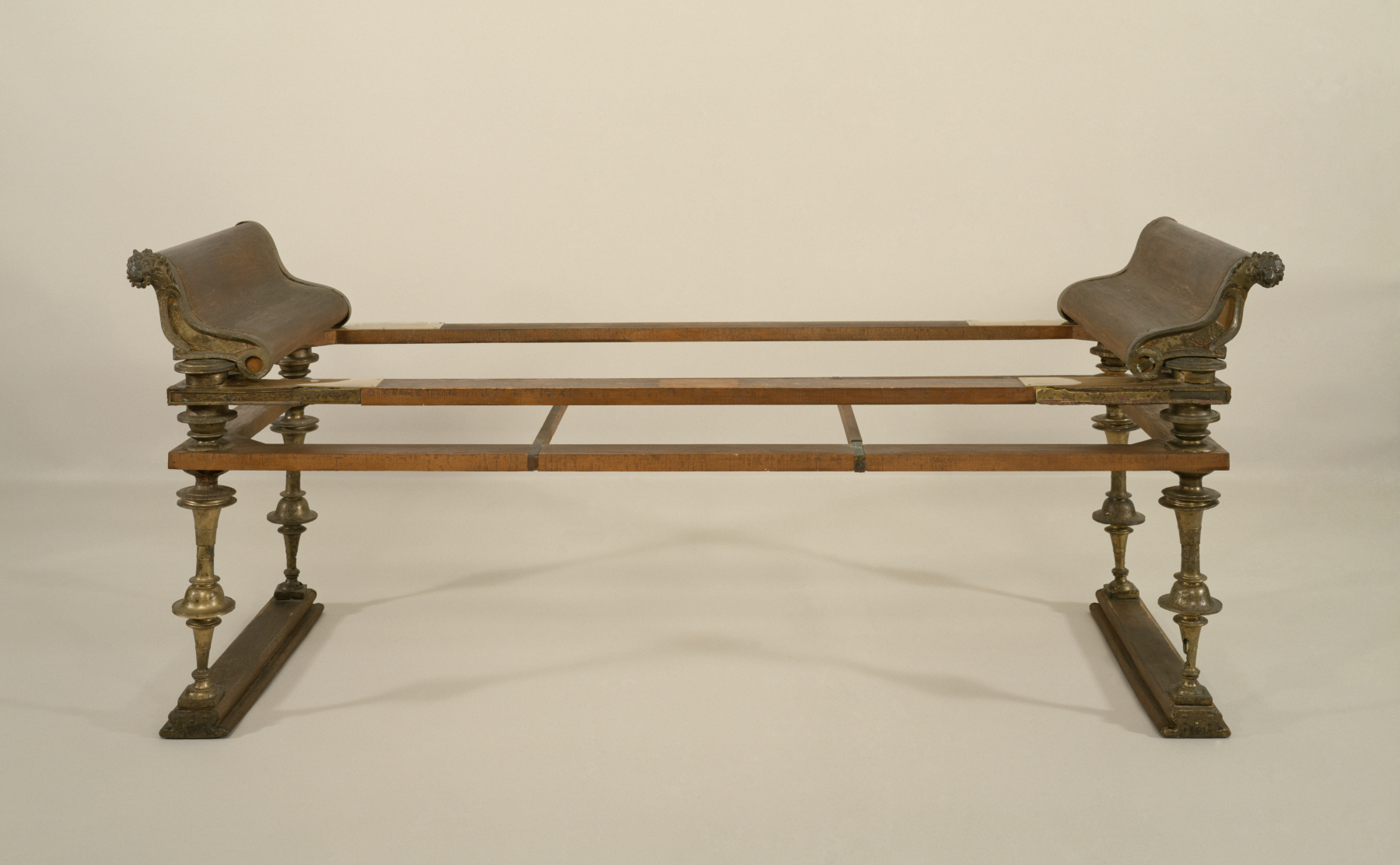
A Roman dining couch, from a tomb

Few actual Roman couches survive, although sometimes the bronze fittings do, which help with the reconstruction of the original forms. While in wealthy households beds were used for sleeping in the bedrooms (lectus cubicularis), and couches for banqueting while reclining were used in the dining rooms (lectus tricliniaris), the less well off might use the same piece of furniture for both functions. The two types might be used interchangeably even in richer households, and it is not always easy to differentiate between sleeping and dining furniture. The most common type of Roman bed took the form of a three-sided, open rectangular box, with the fourth (long) side of the bed open for access. While some beds were framed with boards, others had slanted structures at the ends, called fulcra, to better accommodate pillows. The fulcra of elaborate dining couches often had sumptuous decorative attachments featuring ivory, bronze, copper, gold, or silver ornamentation.

The bench, or subsellium, was an elongated stool for two or more users. Benches were considered to be "seats of the humble," and were used in peasant houses, farms, and bathhouses. However, they were also found in lecture halls, in the vestibules of temples, and served as the seats of senators and judges. Roman benches, like their Greek precedents, were practical for the seating of large groups of people and were common in theaters, amphitheaters, odeons and auctions. The scamnum, related to the subsellium but smaller, was used as both a bench and a footstool.

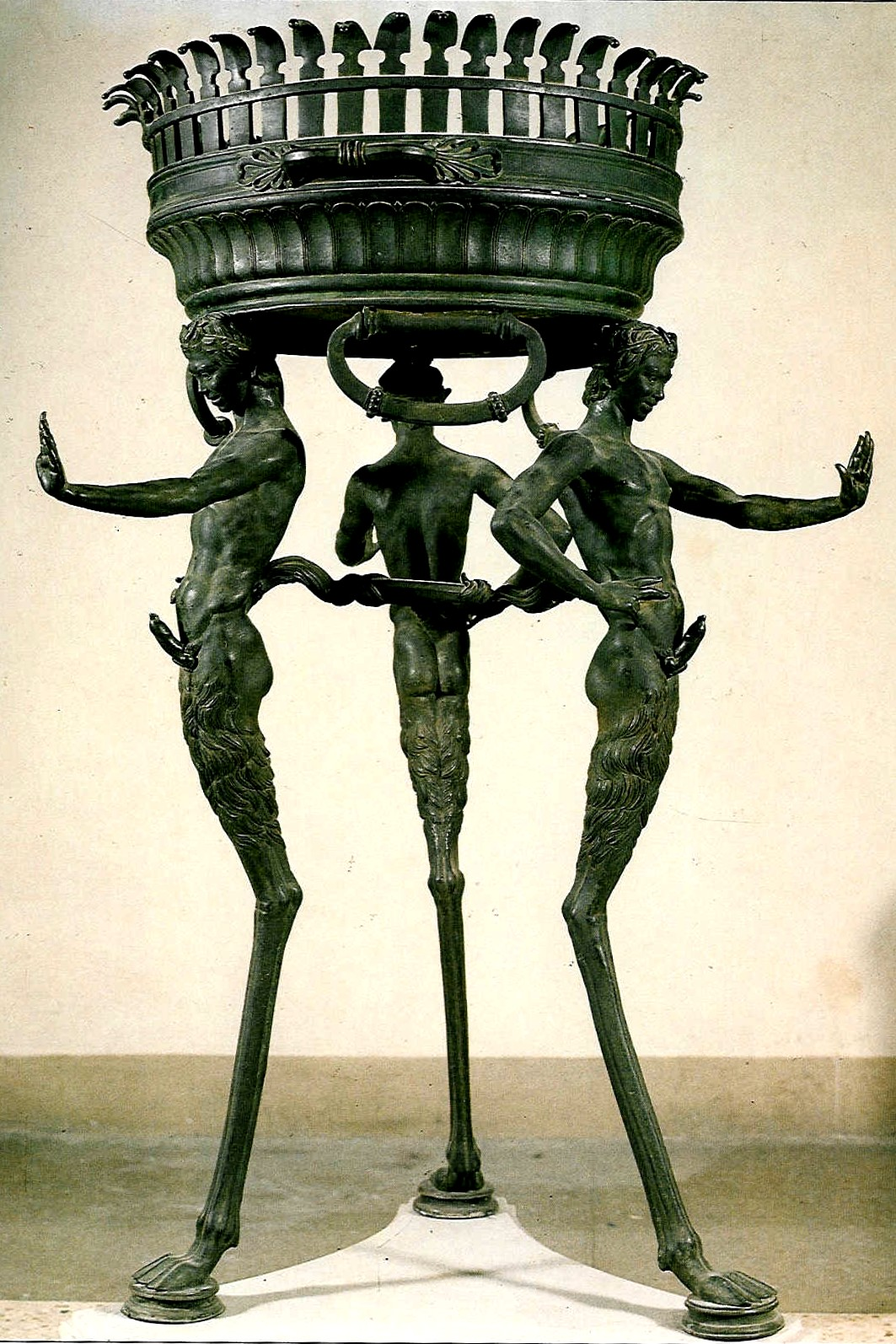
Metal brazier with satyrs, from Pompei

=== Tables ===
Types of Roman tables include the abacus and the mensa, which are distinguished from one another in Latin texts. The term abacus might be used for utilitarian tables, such as those for making shoes or kneading dough, as well as high-status tables, such as sideboards for the display of silverware. A low, three-legged table, thought to represent the mensa delphica, was often depicted next to reclining banqueters in Roman paintings. This table has a round tabletop supported by three legs configured like those of a tripod. Several wooden tables of this type were recovered from Herculaneum.

=== Surviving examples ===
The most important source for wooden furniture of the Roman period is the collection of carbonized furniture from Herculaneum. While the eruption of Vesuvius in 79 C.E. was tremendously destructive to the region, the pyroclastic surges that engulfed the town of Herculaneum ultimately preserved the wooden furniture, shelves, doors, and shutters in carbonized form. Their preservation, however, is imperiled, as some of the pieces remain in situ in their houses and shops, encased in unprotected glass or entirely open and accessible. Upon excavation, much of the furniture was conserved with paraffin wax mixed with carbon powder, which coats the wood and obscures important details such as decorations and joinery. It is now impossible to remove the wax coating without further damaging the furniture. Several wooden pieces were found with bone and metal fittings.

Wooden shelving and racks are found in shops and kitchens in the Vesuvian sites, and one house has elaborate wooden room dividers.

== India ==
Bamboo, alongside shisham, mango, and teak wood were common furniture materials in ancient India. The bamboo's colors ranged from yellow to black. The lower classes of ancient India had beds made of a mat extended across a small frame. Houses of the poor would also have basins, stone jar-stands, querns, palettes, flat dishes, a brass drinking vessel with a spout, a lamp, jars, mortar, pots, knives, saws, axes, and ivory needles and awls. Indians also had access to wooden chairs, bed stands, and stools. As well as reed mats, bamboo thrones, and copper lamps.

== Japan ==
=== Terminology ===
Furniture was of limited usage in Japan. Despite this, defining furniture in Japan can be difficult, as the furniture that did exist was very diverse, with furniture varying widely depending on the social status of the owner. Furniture also changed drastically over the course of Japanese history. Another problem is that the Japanese word kagu, meaning furniture, has referred to many things not considered furniture in other languages. This word also has not been used throughout Japanese history. Kagu dates back to the Meiji era. After Japan imported furniture from the west the term kagu was used to describe the new kinds of furniture.

=== Kinds of Furniture ===
==== Byōbu and noren ====
A byōbu

The screens used to partition areas were called byōbu and noren respectively. To build these kinds of furniture, tatami mats would be laid down. Concurrently, a low table or a free-standing shelf needed to be set in place. The byōbu is a multi-paneled screen covered in paintings. Each panel is called an andon. The name byōbu means "wind-shelter." It appeared in Japan at an unknown point in time. However, the earliest known historical record of it shows that a Korean ambassador presented the kind of folding screen to the emperor in 686. Another academic by the name of Akiyama suggests that the byōbu was created during the Kamakura period. These folding screens would have been used exclusively by the aristocracy at first. This kind of folding screen provided privacy. Eventually, another use was found for the byōbu. Chinese and Japanese art styles, called kara-e and yamato-e were both used on the byōbu to create paintings. Usually these paintings were of people in verdant landscapes. The usage of the byōbu as a canvas increased in popularity during the Edo period; however, it declined as time went on. Culminating in its scarcity today. Norens were straw or cloth curtains that guarded the entrances to homes. Sometimes the norens were made of rope woven with hemp. Usually norens had many vertical slits which would determine the way you entered the building. Norens had other purposes. They could block the sun and merchants would dye their stores name on their norens. Sometimes these names would not be names of stores but instead they might simply state something like "sushi." This led to the noren becoming a symbol of business and reputation. Merchants would sign contracts on their norens and to act poorly would "sully your noren."

==== Fusuma ====
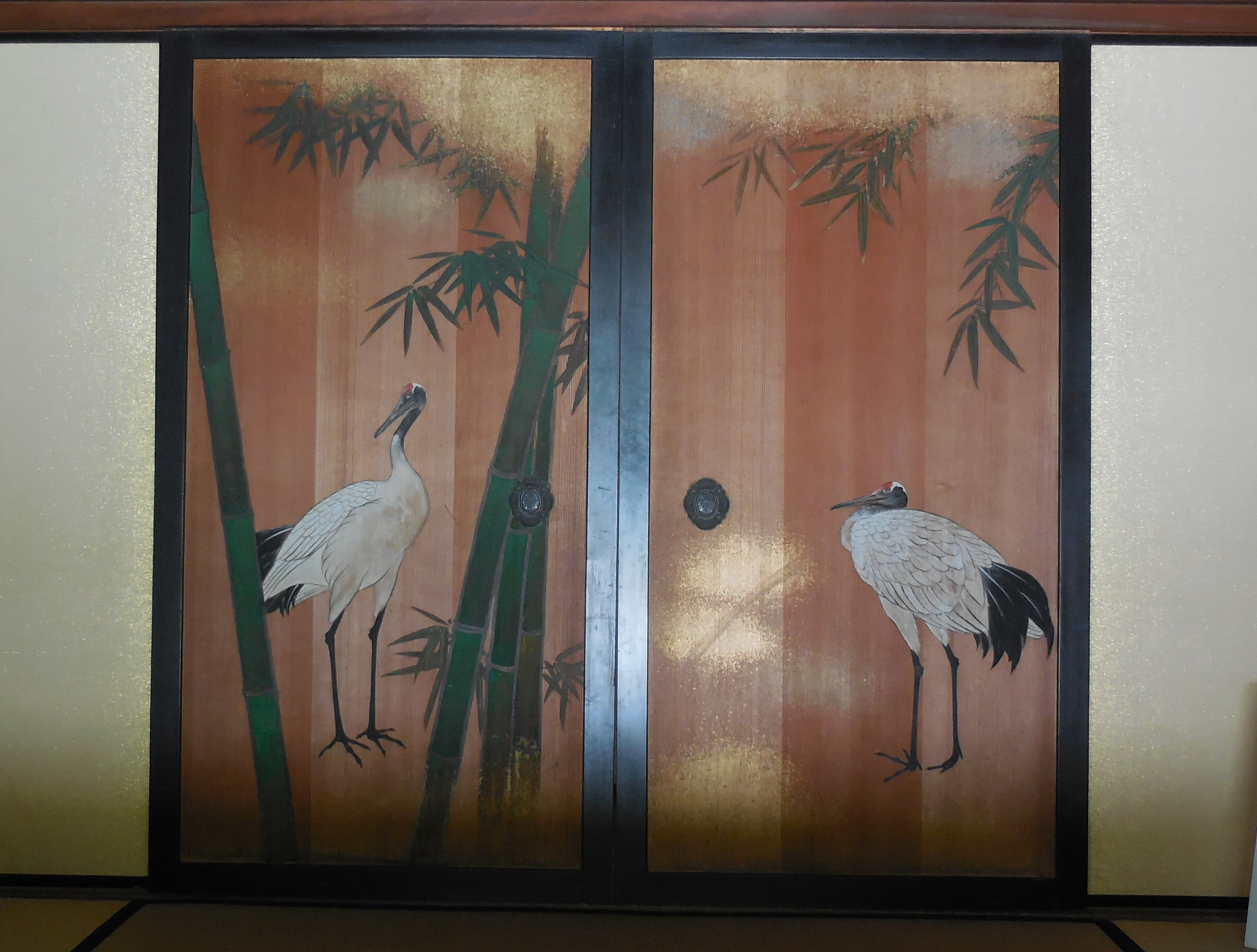
A fusuma

The Fusuma is made from a transparent paper panels called andons stretched across a frame, used to divide houses. Fusuma also provided support for decorations. Many fusuma had aluminum or plastic frames or sliding partitions. Fusumas were used to guide the eye to painted landscapes. Sometimes the fusuma were painted. They would be decorated by the most skilled artists in Japan. This kind of furniture was not fixed, it would move and change.

==== Shoji ====
The Shoji is a kind of Japanese sliding paper door. It was divided into smaller rectangular panels. This piece of furniture used black lacquered strips to make its framework. Paper, polylastex, plastics, and fabrics were used to fill in the open rectangular spaces. They separated parts of houses, served as screens, and concealed undesirable parts of houses.

==== Tansu ====
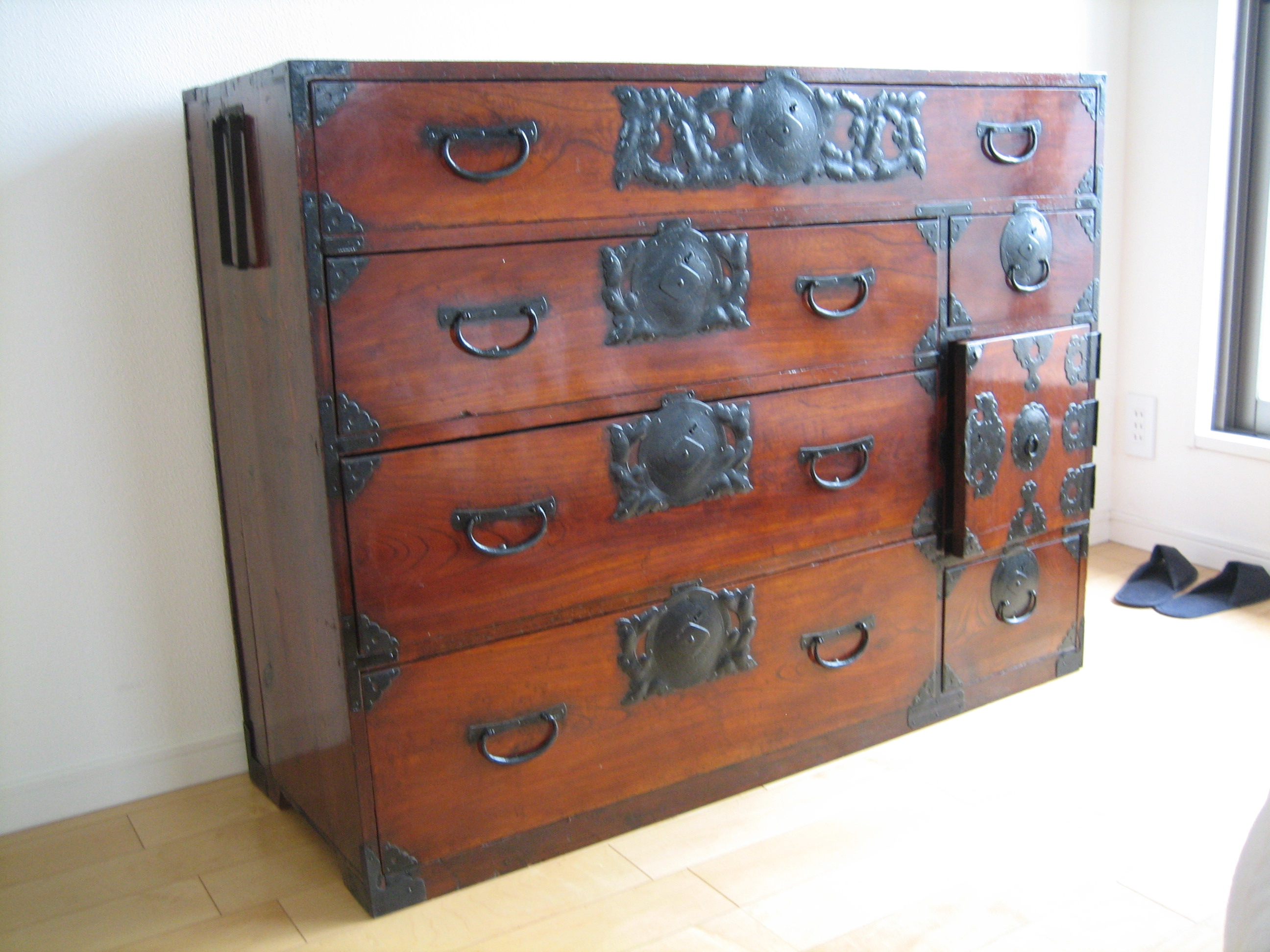
A tansu

The tansu was a kind of Japanese traditional chest. There were many kinds of tansu. Mizuya-dansu were large kitchen chests primarily used for holding utensils and tableware. Kaidan-dansu, or staircase tansu functioned as replacements for staircases. Yofuku-dansu were chests used for storing clothes. Chests used for holding tea were called cha-dansu. Many other types existed. Such as ship-board tansu, traveling tansu, tansu designed for shops, and strong-box tansu. Some tansu had cast-iron metalwork. To build most tansu a framework made of hardwood would be combined with softwood drawers and shelves. Tansu were crafted all throughout Japan. However, northeastern Honshu was a major producer of tansu. This was because Honshu had access to expensive and valued woods. Such as keyaki, sugi, hinoki, and kiri wood. Paulownia wood was highly valued by the Japanese because it does not expand or contract much. Making it easier to work with. This wood is also resistant to high temperature and has a high combustion point.

==== Oshiire ====
The Oshiire was a type of closet in Japan. To enter it one needed to pass through a fusuma. These closets had a shelf where cotton filled mattresses would be stored. Sometimes beds themselves would be built into the Oshiire. The word Oshiire literally translates to "push in" bedding closets.

==== Other and materials ====
Japanese households also had family shrines called butsudan. Other than reading stands, writing stands, headrests, Kimono racks, and armrests, there was no other furniture in Japan. Most furniture would not be decorated unless it was lacquered. Despite the fact that bamboo was common in the furniture of India and China, bamboo was not common in Japanese furniture.

=== History ===
Japanese furniture generally did not have legs or stands. All furniture was low, remaining within reach of a person sitting on the floor. This was because most Japanese people sat on the floor instead of using chairs or tables. In many parts of the world, cultures sat on the floor instead of using chairs and tables to gain easier movement and look at the world from a different perspective. Since the Yayoi period, people have lived in pit dwellings. Eventually, houses started to be built out of timber with its bark unshaven. These houses would have antechambers made for women. The antechamber was separated from the rest of the world by doors made of curtains and window blinds made of grass called sudare. Beds would be made by stacking mushiro mats and then spreading the mats with a fusuma quilt.

Screens were one of the most important and common kinds of furniture in Japan. Shitsurai is a Japanese word referring to a carpentry technique called the "from the floor" approach. Shitsurai originated from another style called shinden style. Which originated from the Heian period. Shinden style was generally sparse. It involved little furniture and generally produced barren houses. This style utilized folding screens and doorway curtains to partition areas. Eventually, this style of architecture developed into the Shoin style. With this new style, many new types of screens were developed. Removable and slidable screens called fusuma, Translucent paper panels called shoji, tansu, sudare blinds, doorway curtains, and folding screens were all adopted. All of these mats were 3 feet by 6 feet. Tansu mats might be stacked on top of each other.

== China ==
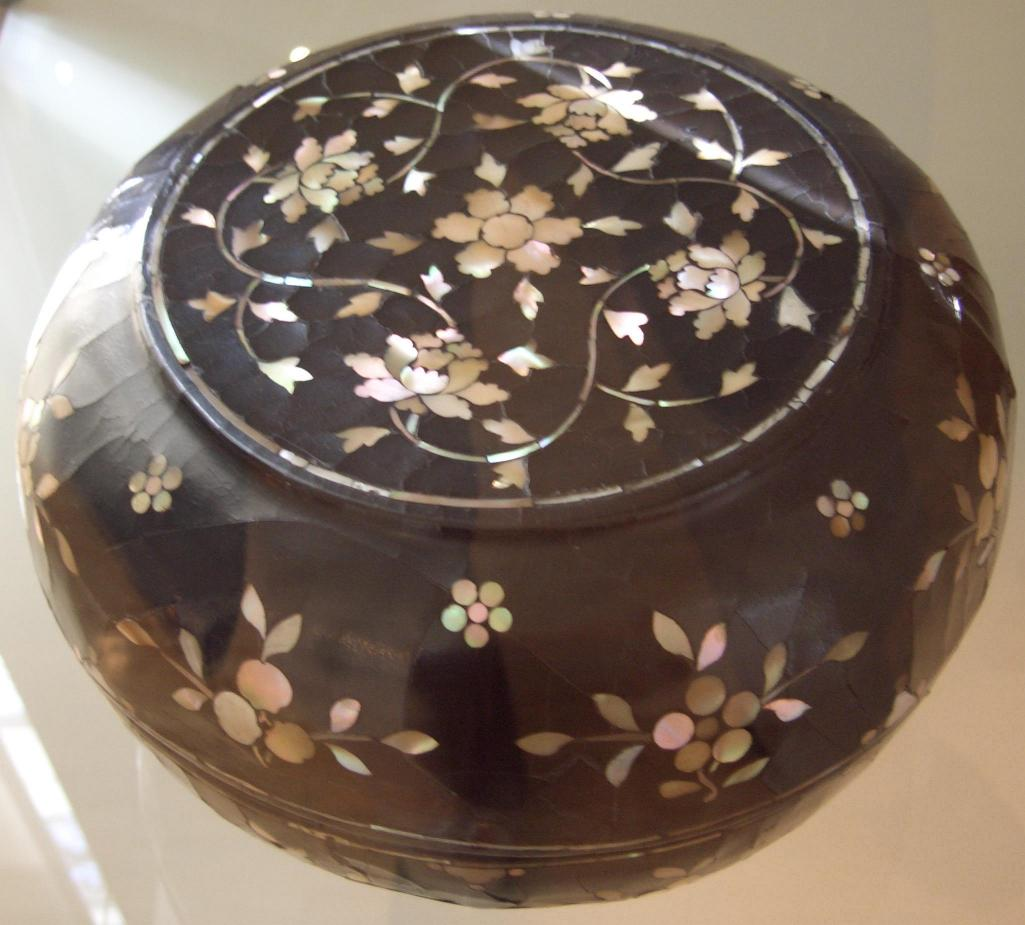
Lacquer box with inlaid mother of pearl peony decor, Ming dynasty, 16th century

Bamboo was a highly valued material in ancient China, and other woods would be carved to look like it. In the Ming dynasty, mainly in southern China, bamboo was used to make furniture that would be used outside; the bamboo would be made by growing the plant in a prepared sheath. Furniture could also be made from dense hardwoods (known collectively as "rosewood" (紅木, literally "red wood") (紅木pinyin: Hóngmù)) and softwoods. Most wooden furniture in ancient China was lacquered. Joinery was also common in ancient Chinese and Indian furniture. Mortise and tenon joints were very common in Chinese furniture. The huchaung was a consolable folding chair that appeared by the latter part of the Han dynasty.

Screens were introduced to China in the Shang dynasty and Western Zhou dynasty. As time went on carpentry and woodworking techniques developed. Carpenters such as Lu Ban contributed greatly to this development. These new techniques being commonly used in the Warring States period and the Spring and Autumn period. The mortise and tennon joint was developed in the Warring States period.

== Levant ==
=== Religious ===
Throughout rural Israel and Judah household shrines were common. Some rural shrines and other religious objects found in ancient houses are: a tripod basalt offering bowl, a zoomorphic figurine head, a carved ivory panel depicting a griffin, and terracotta masks. These would be accompanied by Cypro-Phoenician vessels, censers, amulets, stamp seals, chalice fragments, and metal objects. Aside from this, ancient households in the Levant might have ceramic vessels, Phoenician pitchers, censer cups, and zoomorphic vessels. All of these materials suggest that the kinds of religious activity these people would have engaged in involved offering food and drink to the gods in return for blessings. Other kinds of religious furniture such as astragali usually had magic connotations. Terracotta figurines have been found throughout ancient Israel and Judah. These figurines are divided into three types. One type depicts a person with a circular dislike object on the left breast. The object is possibly a tambourine or a cake. A second type depicts a figure with outstretched limbs supporting breasts. This is possibly a depiction of the goddess Astarte or a fertility figurine. It could also be done to emphasize the features of the female body. The third type depicts a person on a horse, which is possibly a male deity named Baal.

=== Chairs, beds, and other ===
Hebrews furniture was often borrowed from other cultures. In ancient Israel ordinary people used stools and chairs that had footrests and armrests and did not have upholstery. King Solomon had a chair made with armrests and a throne that was six steps higher than the floor and laid with ivory carvings and plated in gold. The throne was six steps higher than the floor. Most houses only had one chair and table. It is possible that ancient Israeli tables might have just been a raised piece of earth. Sometimes they would have cushions and mats. Beds did exist in ancient Israel. Solomon had a bed made of cedar, silver, and gold with linen sheets, and scented with cinnamon and other spices. Members of the upperclass had beds with pillows made from goatskins filled with feathers or wool. Other beds had cushions. Most people would have used mats instead of beds. Ancient Israelites also had cosmetic spoons, cosmetic bottle stoppers, round pyxides mirror handles, and platter to eat food.

=== Wood and ivory ===
Woods such as olive wood were used to make furniture in ancient Israel. Other materials were still used. Ivory was a particularly common resource. It was used to make wardrobes and round lace-like openwork plaques. Ivory was used to make inlaid furniture in Samaria. They would also have patterns of colored paste with precious stones coated with gold or leaves. Alternatively, they could have the colored paste and stones painted. These ivories would have Phoenician letters inscribed on their backs. Ivories tended to be mounted with pegs onto beds, chairs, and stools. This would then be hidden by ivory florets.

== Mesoamerica ==
=== Maya ===
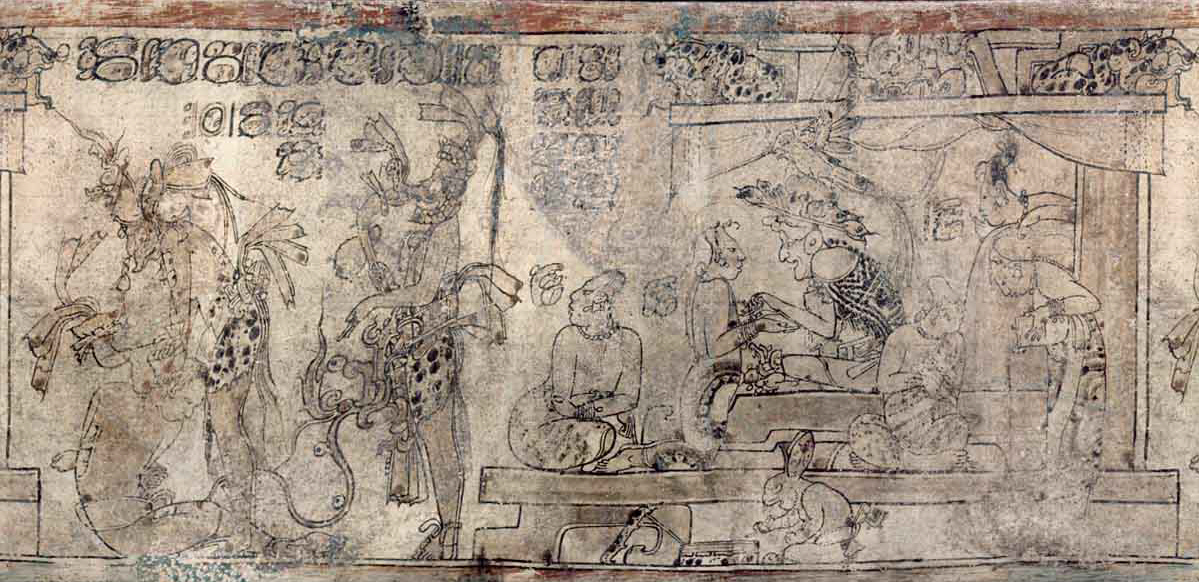
Maya ceramic. Possibly depicting god L

In one Mayan ceramic, a god who is possibly god L is shown seated on a throne-like stool covered in cloth placed on a raised platform. Carved stone pieces of furniture called chacmools would be used to hold offerings in sacrificial ceremonies. Some chacmools were painted with bright colors. Instead of doors, Mayan homes may have had a cloth or a blanket hanging on the entryway. Bed frames were made from wood and covered in a woven straw mat. The bed frames were usually very low on the floor. Most likely, the only big furniture in a home would be wooden stools or benches. However, it there might also be baskets, small wooden chests, cotton bags, pottery, and stone tools. Mayans usually would hang bunches of chili peppers from the roofs of their houses. A hollowed-out chunk of wood called a bee pot was also common. Bees without stingers would be housed in the pot to make honey.

=== Aztecs ===
A quantity of furniture in an Aztec home would have been uncommon sight. Usually instead of beds or chairs, mats made of reeds or dirt platforms were used to sit or sleep on. Nobleman would have curtains and murals around their sleeping areas. Aside from this, Aztec households have low tables, and small kitchens. Belongings were kept in wooden blocks or reed chests. Looms, pots, frying pans, and grinding stones for grinding corn, hunting, and fishing gear were common tools amongst the Aztecs. The Tlatoani, such as Moctezuma, would have had wooden chairs, dining tables, and ceremonial shrines.

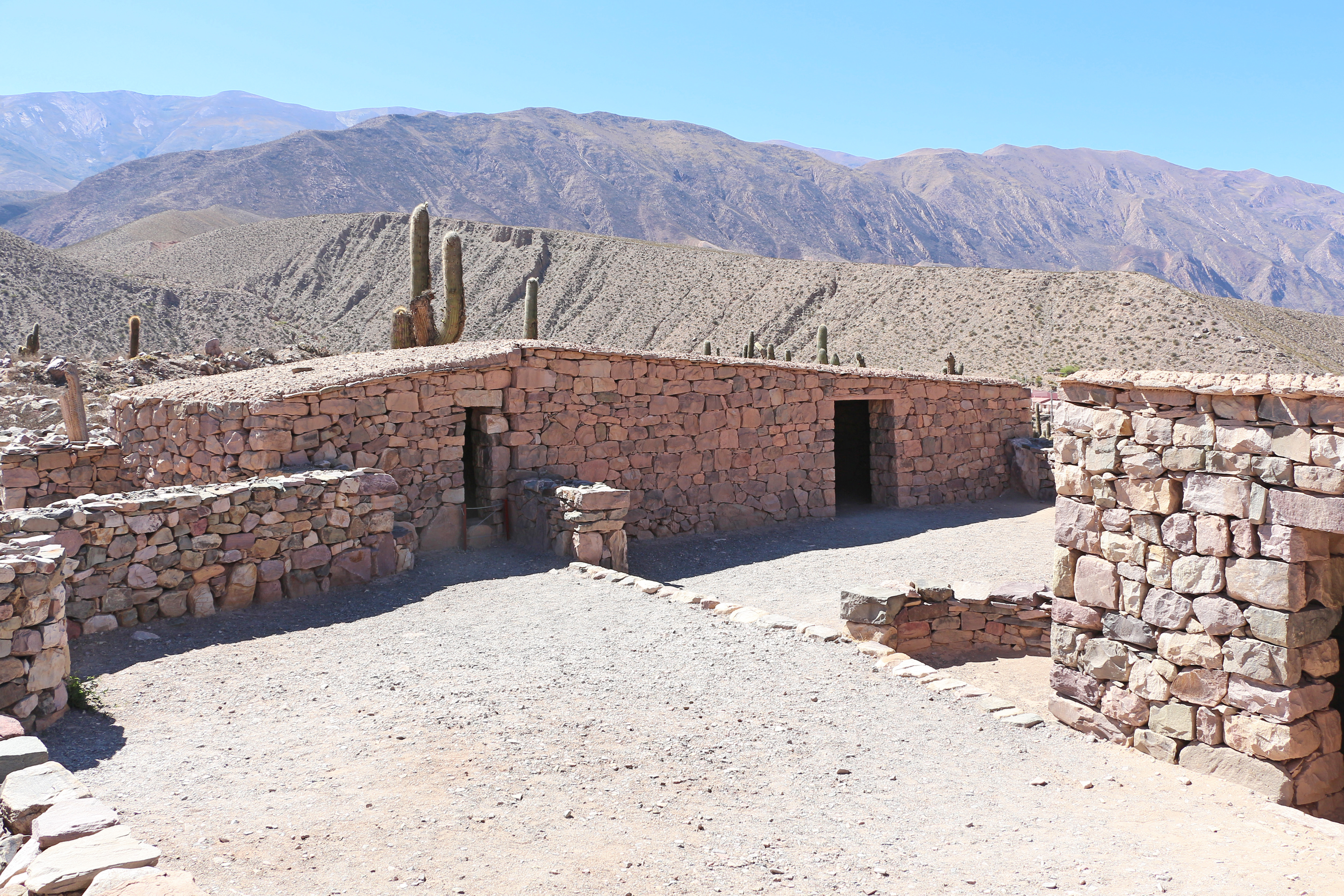
Pucará de Tilcara

=== Incans ===
In Incan temples, the important areas were decorated with gold and polished reflective surfaces. The typical Incan house had adobe walls with hollow niches to store items. Incan houses also had animal skins and woven mats to decorate their floors. They also used brightly dyed woven materials for blankets and wall hangings. Pucará de Tilcara has sites related to crafts production, processing, storage, and food consumption. Some areas were reused for burial.
