= Turkey oak =

Turkey oak is a common name for several species of oaks and may refer to:

- Quercus cerris, native to southeastern Europe and Asia Minor
- Quercus laevis, native to the southeastern United States
