= Theater drapes and stage curtains =

Large piece of cloth designed to mask backstage areas of a theater from spectators

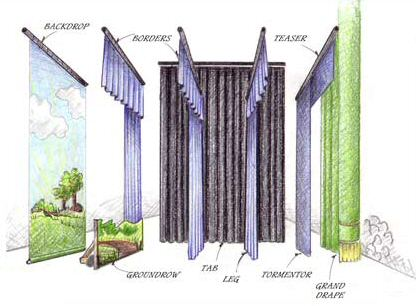
Different types of curtains.

Theater drapes and stage curtains are large pieces of cloth that are designed to mask backstage areas of a theater from spectators. They are designed for a variety of specific purposes, moving in different ways (if at all) and constructed from various fabrics. Many are made from black or other darkly colored, light-absorbing material (In North America, for example, heavyweight velour is the current industry standard). Theater drapes represent a portion of any production's soft goods, a category comprising any non-wardrobe, cloth-based element of the stage or scenery. Theater curtains are often pocketed at the bottom to hold weighty chain or to accept pipes to remove their fullness and stretch them tight.

Proscenium stages use a greater variety of drapes than arena or thrust stages. In proscenium theaters, drapes are typically suspended from battens and can be controlled by a fly system (i.e., they are "flown," in theater terminology). When a drape is flown, the task of adjusting its height for best masking effect is simplified and, in the case of a drape that must be moved during a performance, this enables the drape to be quickly raised above the proscenium arch—thus positioning it out of view of spectators—or lowered to any desired height above the stage. In flying, instead of using the directions "down" and "up," drapes and curtains are flown "in" and "out," respectively.

== Types of drapes and curtains ==
=== Grand drapes ===
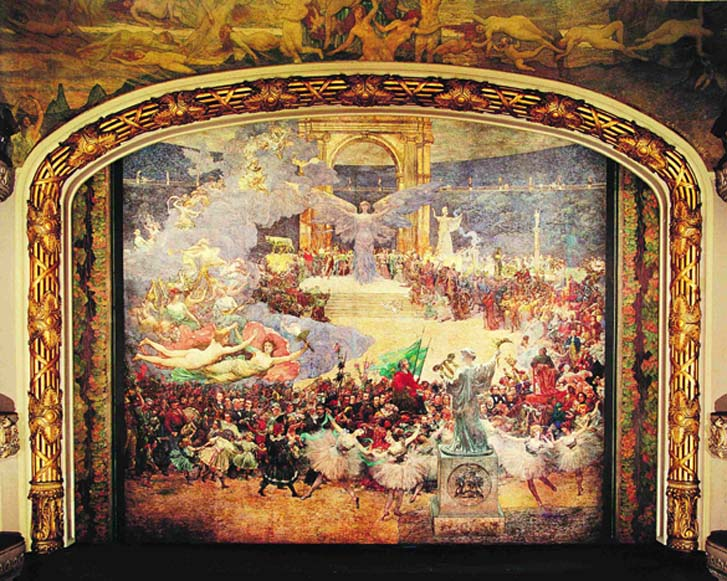
Theatro Municipal do Rio de Janeiro, painting by Eliseu Visconti (1908).

Austrian curtain.

The front curtain, also called house curtain, act curtain, grand drape, main drape, main curtain, proscenium curtain, main rag or, in the UK, tabs, hangs downstage, just behind the proscenium arch. It is typically opened and closed during performances to reveal or conceal the stage and scenery from the audience. There are several styles of front curtains. They can be pleated or flat; can part in the centre; can be drawn upwards, sideways, or diagonally; and can fly out, gather out, or roll out.

The grand valance is a short curtain that hangs between the proscenium and the grand drape. It may match in color and style or it may be more ornate. The valance can be used to create the top of the false proscenium.

=== False proscenium ===
A false proscenium, if in place, creates a smaller frame for the stage within the proper theatre proscenium. It is formed at the top by a horizontal teaser (or house header in the UK) and at the sides by vertical tormentors (or side maskings). These pieces can be made with drapery or hard materials. "Hard" teasers and tormentors are typically constructed with a wooden frame faced with thin plywood and dark colored, light-absorbing material like velour. The teaser is usually hung from a dedicated batten so that its height can be independently adjusted to optimize the masking of the fly system and its loads.

In some productions, a show portal is used in place of teaser and tormentors as a decorative frame for the stage, often designed with the current production in mind. It can be employed in front of or behind the front-of-house curtain, and it too serves to mask backstage areas.

=== Legs, borders, travelers, and tabs ===
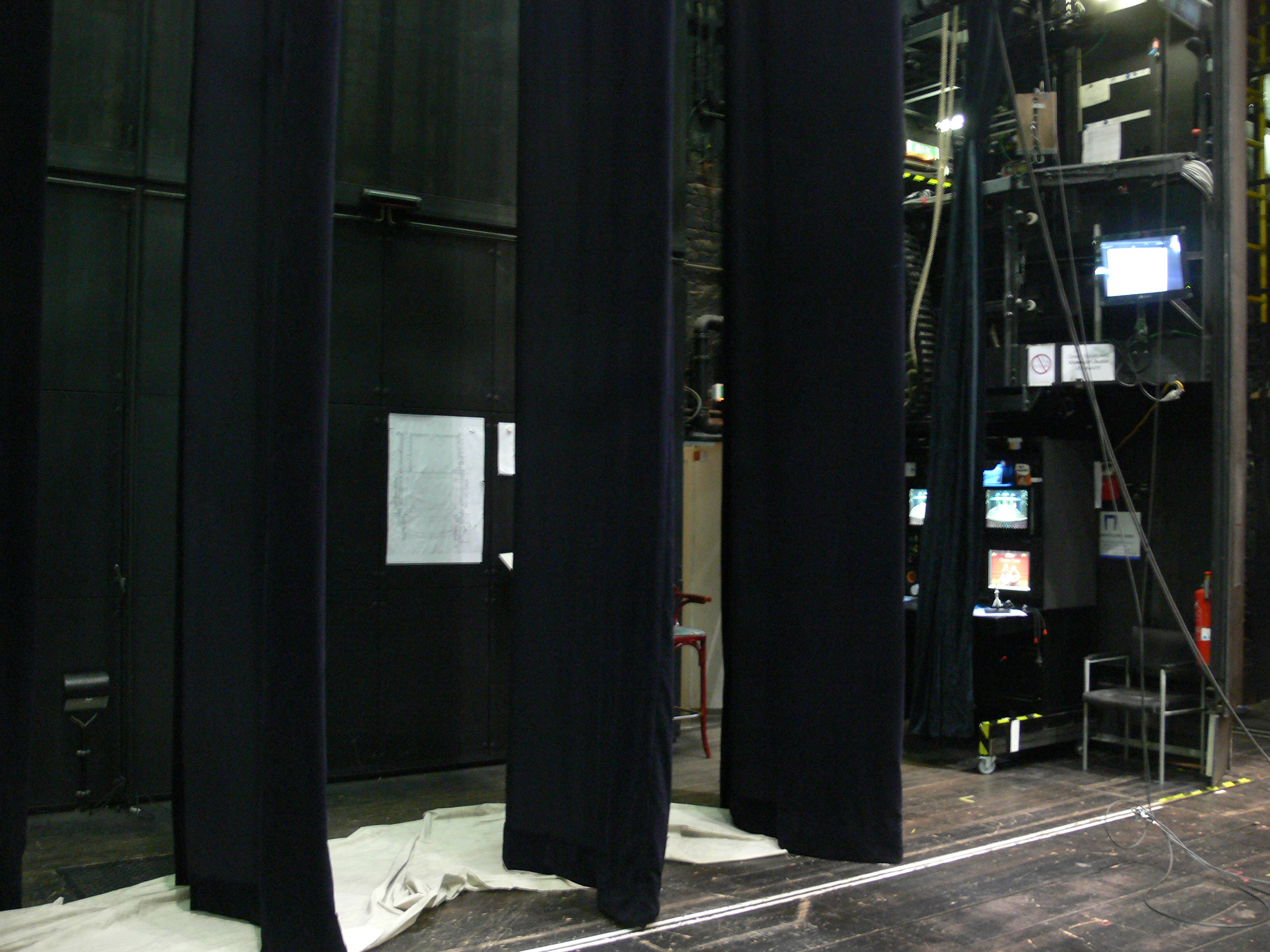
Legs masking the theater wings

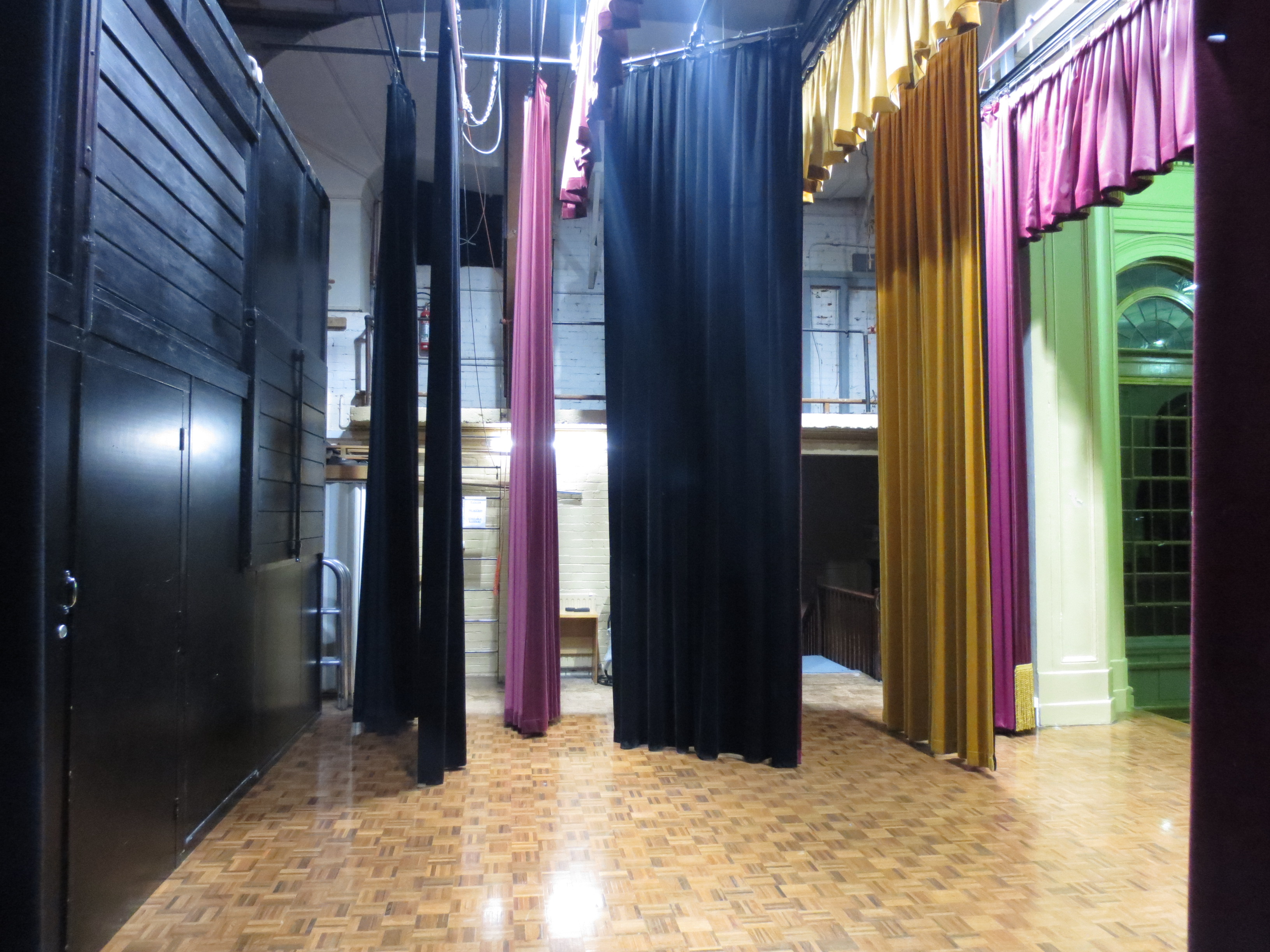
Theatre side and top curtains (black, beige, pink) (Albert Hall stage, Canberra) (2016)

Legs are tall, narrow drapes hung parallel to the proscenium at the sides of the stage. They're used to frame the sides of the acting space as well as to mask the wings, where actors and set pieces may be preparing to enter the stage.

Borders are short drapes hung above the stage, spanning its width. They're used to mask equipment and hidden scenery above. Borders hung close to lights are backed with heat and flame-resistant material. Legs and borders are typically made from a heavy, light-absorbing material similar to that of other stage drapes. One border downstage of a pair of legs forms a complete masking frame around the stage. Dependent on venue size, three or more sets of legs & borders may be employed at varying upstage distances from the proscenium. More legs allow for more locations for actors to enter from.

Travelers, also known as draw curtains and (when flown) bounce or guillotine curtains, are curtains that open and close horizontally. They're used to reveal or obscure everything upstage and sometimes create a portal. They can be rigged with an operating line, which is motorised or pulled manually. The rear stage wall may be obscured by a traveler, if a cyclorama or projection screen is not in place.

Tabs, also known as up-and-downers (UK) or Germans, are drapes hung perpendicular to the proscenium and at the sides, used to more completely mask the wings than legs. Unlike most stage drapery, these run up to downstage (hence "up-and-downer"). Note that the name tabs can be short for tableau curtains or even sometimes refer to the aforementioned legs.

A theater may have a single U-shaped track around the sides and back of the stage instead of rear travelers and tabs. Gaps between sections of curtain on the track can be aligned with the legs to form entrances.

=== Scrims ===
A scrim, sometimes gauze, is a curtain made of an open-weave fabric that appears opaque when lit from the front, but transparent when a person or object behind the curtain is lit. Scrims can be painted and used as both a backdrop and a scrim in some situations. Some scrims can also be used for projections but produce a lower quality and intensity of image than a projection screen.

=== Backdrops ===
A backdrop (or backcloth) is a painted curtain that hangs in the back of the stage to indicate the scenery of the performance. Before the advent of motion pictures, theaters would have 6-8 stock painted backdrops on canvas for use in live theatrical performances. Often these would include an urban scene, a nature or garden scene, and a domestic interior.

Drops may be hung by various means. Often made of canvas which has been sized and painted, the top may be pressed between two pieces of lumber (a batten) and clamped to a pipe, with a pipe or chain through a hem pocket at the bottom giving it weight to prevent flapping. Some may be grommeted along the top and tied to the pipe with tie-line (usually drapery cord nowadays). A time-honored method of hanging a drop is the roll-drop, in which the bottom of the drop is attached to a round batten. The drop is rolled onto it from the back, and is deployed by rope rigged through blocks (pulleys) to be pulled from offstage to release the tension holding the batten up, thus unrolling it slowly until completely unfurled.

There is also a form of drop used in Vaudeville days, which may still be seen in older theaters, called an olio. "Olio" means conglomeration, and these drops were most often roll-drops covered with advertisements from various sponsors, for the audience to view between shows.

An olio drop is a similar curtain, but lowered at the front of the stage.

=== Cycloramas ===
A cyclorama, or cyc for short, is a large curtain, often concave, at the back of the stage that can be lit to represent the sky or other backgrounds. Traditionally white or natural colored cloth, cycloramas now come in various colors of white, grey, light blue and the green or blue curtains used in Chroma key (greenscreen) work may also be called cycloramas.

With projected scenery, cycs and scrims may be used as drops, by employing either front or rear projection. This was done in a general sense in the 1910s and 1920s by means of painted glass plates in front of lighting instruments, which made sculptured shadows on the cyc to indicate such images as a cityscape or a scary dungeon. (Focus was generalized in the early days; nowadays projectors have adjustable focus lenses.) Lighting instruments (generally ellipsoidals) may also be used to project scenic effects on cycs and scrims, by using gobos, also known as templates or patterns. With an ellipsoidal reflector, the light source is positioned at one focal point of the three-dimensional ellipse, then the pattern - cut metal or glass or other heat-resistant material - is positioned in reverse position so that the light escaping the instrument passes through the pattern first, then through the other focal point and the lenses, and is projected upon the cyc or scrim.

=== Safety curtain ===
The safety curtain or fire curtain is used to separate the stage from the audience in case of a fire onstage. It may be made of heavy fireproofed fabric or solid steel sheet. Some were made of asbestos cloth. After several deadly theater fires in the early 1900s, safety systems were developed to isolate the stage, direct smoke away from the audience and limit the fire's oxygen supply. The safety curtain can be a major part of that system, physically separating the stage space with the curtain running in a guide pocket on either side of the proscenium to form a better seal. They are often designed to descend automatically when a holding line is cut or a winch brake released with a minimum of operator effort.

== See also ==
- Flat (theatre)
- Theater (structure)
- Curtain
