= Curtain tie-back =

Decorative strip or loop for draping a curtain

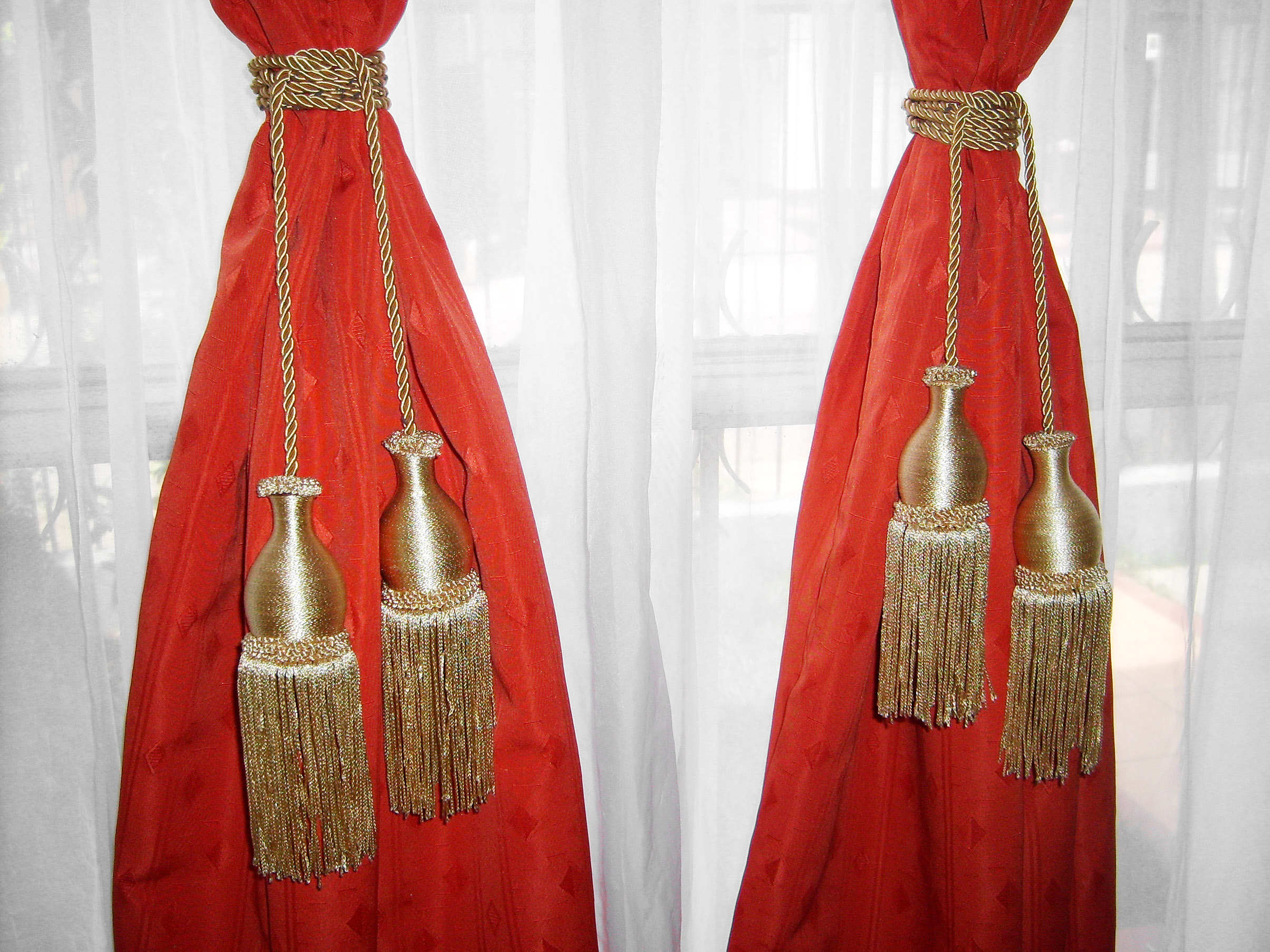
A pair of double-tassel tie-backs

A curtain tie-back is a decorative window treatment which accompanies a cloth curtain. Within the field of interior decoration, tie-backs made of fabric are classified as a kind of "soft furnishing" (along with other fabric-based décor such as pillows, valances, towels, blankets, mattresses, bed skirts, bedspreads, jabots, and shower and window curtains) while those made out of wood, metal, or glass are considered "window hardware" (along with curtain rods, cornices, latches, hinges, push bars, and handles).

== Soft furnishing ==
A simple rope or braid used to secure a curtain to one side of a window is a basic curtain tie-back. Other more elaborate soft furnishing curtain tie-backs usually fall into one of the following categories.

=== Structured tie-back ===
A structured tie-back consists of a single short U-shaped strip of fabric held flat by a piece of interfacing. A ring (often metal, sometimes wood or plastic) is placed at each end of the strip, and the strip is looped around the curtain to hold it in the open position. Both rings are then hung on a peg or hook on a nearby frame or wall.

=== Decorative ruched tie-back ===
A ruched tie-back consists of a roll of interfacing covered with a gathered tube of fabric. Like the structured tie-back, a ring is attached at both ends and the tie-back is secured around the window in the same way.

=== Tassel tie-back ===
Tassels are among the most common form of soft furnishing tie-backs. A tassel tie-back may consist of a single or paired set of tassels connected to a rope or braid with either one or two loops. These loops are secured around the curtain in the same way as the other soft furnishing tie-backs, or the loops may be tied to each other in a loose knot. Depending on the length of the cord, the number of loops, and the number of tassels, several other arrangements are also possible, including some where a tassel is run through a loop or where the curtain is hung inside the loop and the loop is cinched into place by a large bead or a slip knot. The length of rope beyond the cinch bead is referred to as the embrace and must be long enough to comfortably but securely hold the curtain. Too long an embrace and the curtain hangs too much in the window, blocking the view. Too short, and the curtain appears bunched up when secured.

=== Pendulum tie-back ===
Almost a variety of tassel tie-back, the pendulum tie-back consists of one or two large handing decorative pendulums attached to ropes which loop around the curtain.

== Window hardware ==
Hardware forms, often called drapery hooks or curtain hooks, are usually U-shaped pieces of metal, sometimes highly decorative, though other materials such as antler might be used. One leg of the "U" is fixed to the wall and the curtain is pulled over the other leg to secure it. Other forms of hardware tie-backs include the following:

Curtain bind

In its most-basic form, a drape or curtain bind often consists of a ring and a pin: the curtain is "bound" inside the ring by the placement of the pin behind it, holding the curtain in the center of the window rather than along its edge as with most tie-backs. Alternatively, a double-slotted piece of wood or plastic resembling a figure-8 can be used to the same effect. This arrangement is only possible with very brief or sheer curtains.

Knob

A curtain knob consists of a decorative metal or wooden knob projecting directly out from the wall next to the curtain. The width of the knob serves to hold the curtain from spilling back into the window.
