= Bouchara (disambiguation) =

Bouchara may refer to:

- Bouchara, 1981 chamber music composition
- Bouchara (trademark), French fabric and decoration brand
- Mohamed Bouchara (born 1944), Moroccan boxer
