= Tieback =

Tieback may refer to:

- Tieback (geotechnical), a method of supporting retaining walls
- Tieback (subsea), a connection between a new oil and gas discovery and an existing production facility
- Curtain tie-back, a kind of decorative window treatment
