= Window valance =

Covering on the uppermost part of a window

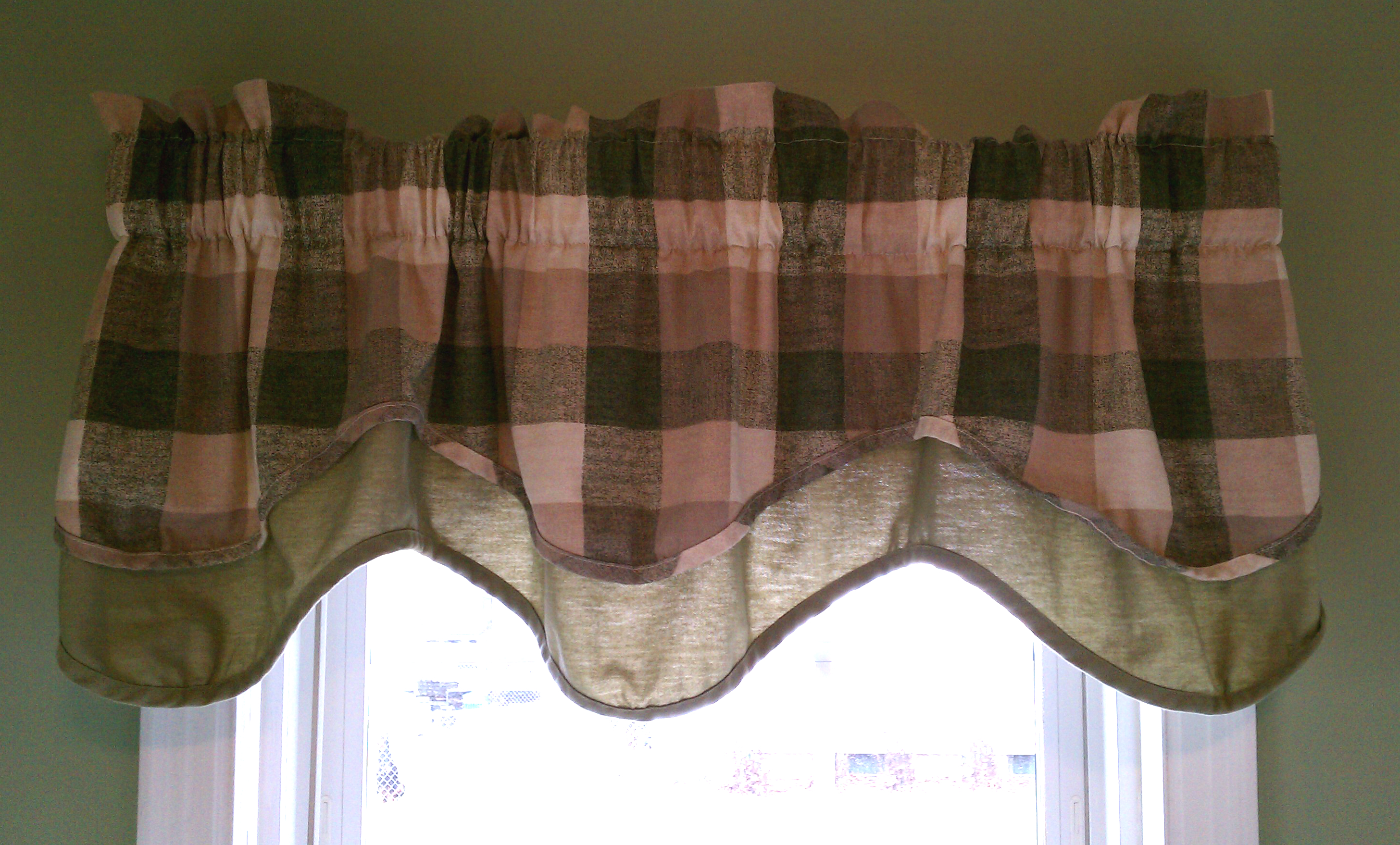
A window valance

A window valance (or pelmet in the UK) is a form of window treatment that covers the uppermost part of the window and can be hung alone or paired with other window blinds or curtains. Valances are a popular decorative choice in concealing drapery hardware. Window valances were popular in Victorian interior design. In draping or bunting form they are commonly referred to as swag.

Valance by Ella Josephine Sterling from the Index of American Design at the National Gallery of Art.

The valance is a treatment made of a piece of decorative fabric usually hung from a rod, a piece of decorative hardware or a board.

== History ==
The earliest recorded history of interior design is rooted in the Renaissance era, a time of great change and rebirth in the world of art and architecture, and much of this time saw understated, simple treatments, eventually moving towards more elaborate fabrics of multiple layers of treatments, including, towards the end of this period, valances, swags, jabots, and pelmets. By the Baroque and early Georgian period (1643–1730), elaborate and theatrical treatments placed high emphasis on the cornice and pelmet as a way to finish off the top of a window treatment.

== Purpose ==
Valances can be used alone but are often hung over windows where curtains and drapes have been installed to better frame the windows. They are often installed over kitchen sinks or in other areas where floor space may be limited or blocked; they can be used to hide architectural flaws and windows placed at different heights; when using blinds, shades, and shutters, valances are often used to soften the windows or to tie in the fabrics of corresponding furniture such as couches and recliners.

== Types ==
Window valances are also called window top treatments. They can range from simple to elaborate and take on many shapes: scalloped, layered, pointed, arched, pleated, shaped, gathered, tailored, grommet top.

Valances can be manufactured with any type of fabric, but most are made of jacquard, silk, faux silk, poly/cotton, linen, satin, velvet and polyester. Many are lined with an extra piece of fabric sewn on the back to prevent the solar radiation from damaging the fabric.

=== Balloon valance ===
The fabric of this valance curtain "balloons" out providing a full appearance. Balloon valances are commonly made of lightweight cotton material.

=== Swag valance ===
The fabric of this valance curtain hangs across brackets and drapes over the top of a window, with tails hanging down on each side. Almost any type of fabric can be used. When a lightweight or sheer fabric is used this may be known as a scarf valance.

=== Ascot valance ===
The fabric of this valance forms triangular shapes which hang over curtains or drapes. These valances are often made of more elaborate materials, including silk or velvet fabric with tassels or fringe.

=== Italian valance ===
The fabric drapes across the top of the window with the length of the fabric forming a curve with the shortest width at the center of the window.

=== Box pleat ===
A flat, symmetrical fold of cloth sewn in place to create fullness, spaced evenly across the top of a drapery. The fabric can be folded back on either side of the pleat to show, for example, a contrasting fabric.

=== Cascade ===
A zig-zag-shaped piece of fabric falling gracefully from the top of a drapery or top treatment. Cascades can also be called an ascot or jabot, depending upon the shape and pleat pattern used.

=== Cornice ===
A rigid treatment that sometimes serves as a mask for holding attached stationary draperies or for hiding window hardware or even masking architectural flaws. The cornice is typically constructed of a chipboard-style wood or other lightweight material over which some kind of padding is placed, then covered with a fabric of choice and finished with decorative trim or cording. Like all other valances, a cornice is usually mounted on the outside of the window frame.

=== Jabot ===
A stationary panel, decorative in nature, used in tandem with a swag (festoon), also known as a tail.

=== Pelmet ===
Much like a valance, only the fabric has been stiffened and shaped and then embellished with a variety of decorative edgings, including trims, tassels or color bands.

=== Rosette ===
Fabric gathered into a shape of a flower. Typically placed at the top right and left corners of a window frame to accent an existing treatment, such as a scarf or drapery panel.

=== Scarf ===
A single, lengthy piece of lightweight fabric with a color/pattern that shows on both sides (as opposed to simply being imprinted on one side) that either wraps loosely around a stationary rod, or loops through decorative brackets placed on either side of a window frame.

=== Swag & tail ===
A section of draped fabric at the top of the window that typically resembles a sideways “C” shape (swag) sometimes coupled with a vertical “tail” which hangs on either side of the swag. There are many kinds of swag top treatments, but the prevalent styles are the basic pole swag or the bias swag which can be hung in a variety of ways, including from a cornice box or a pole attached directly to the inside of a window frame.
