= Curtain rod =

Device used to suspend curtains

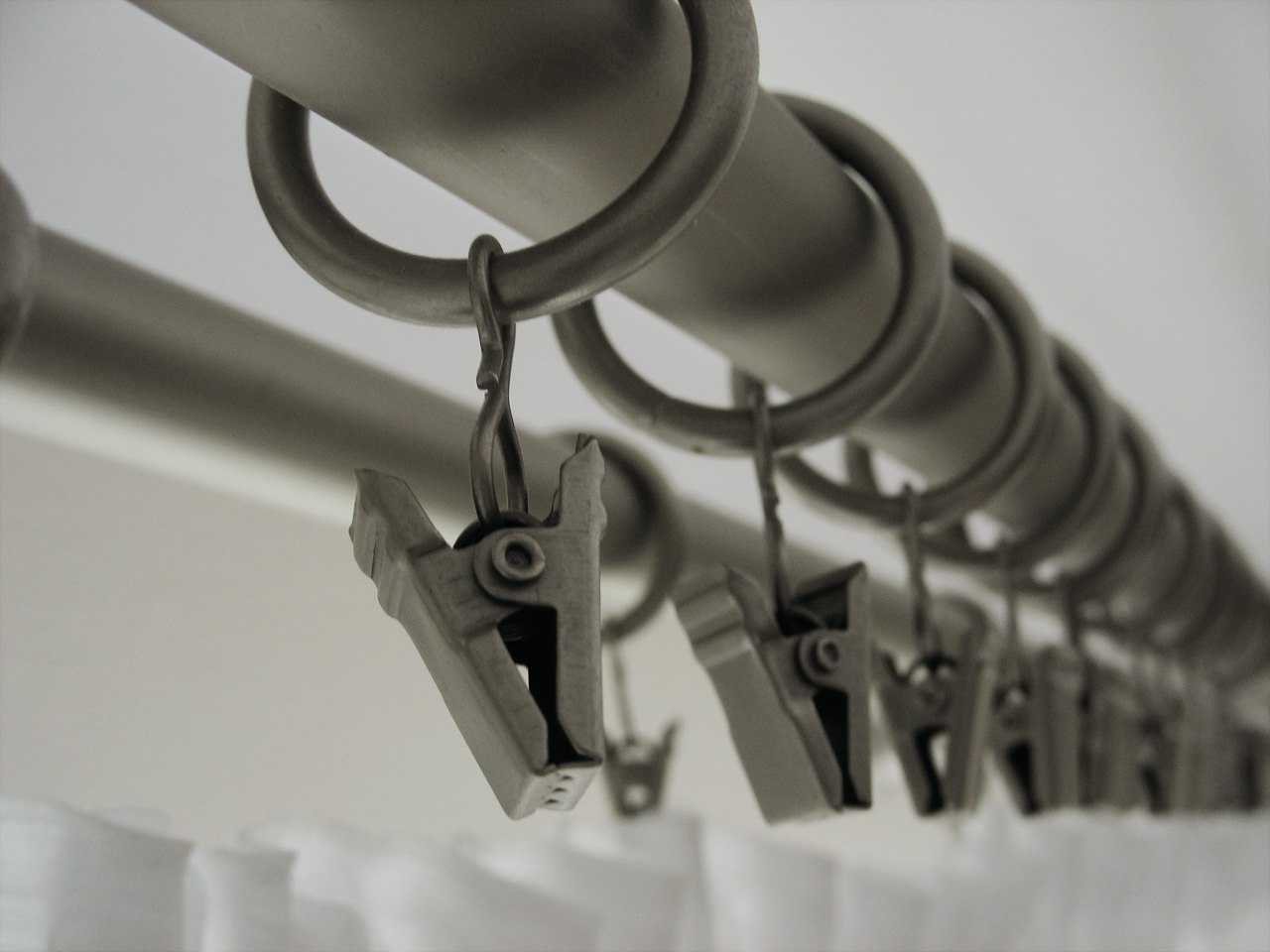
Curtain rod

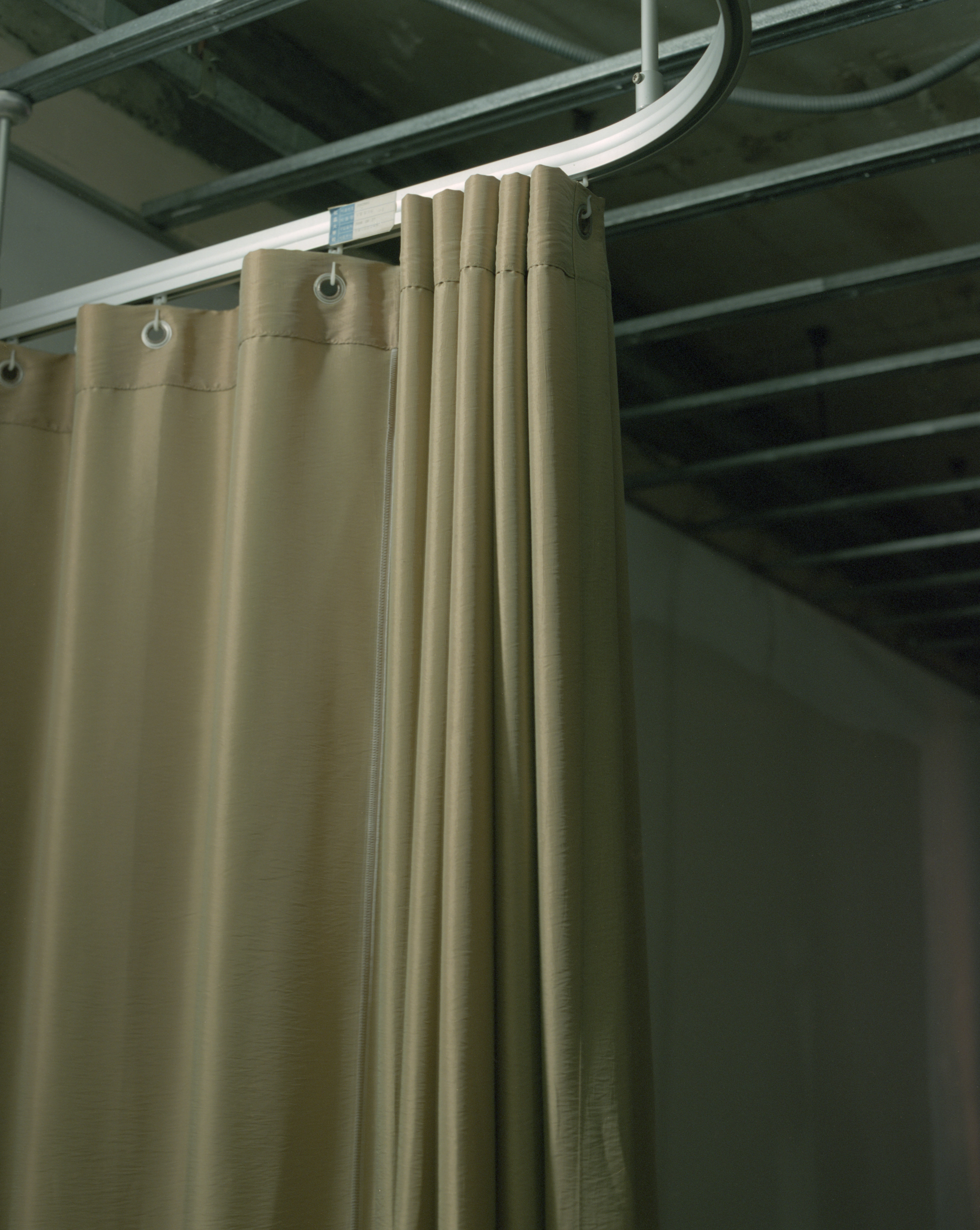
Ready-made curtain rail.

A curtain rod, curtain rail, curtain pole, or traverse rod is a device used to suspend curtains, usually above windows or along the edges of showers or bathtubs, though also wherever curtains might be used. When found in bathrooms, curtain rods tend to be telescopic and self-fixing, while curtain rods in other areas of the home are often affixed with decorative brackets or finial. Special poles can be made for bay windows or made by joining a number of straight and corner bends to fit the shape of a bay window.

== Bathtubs ==
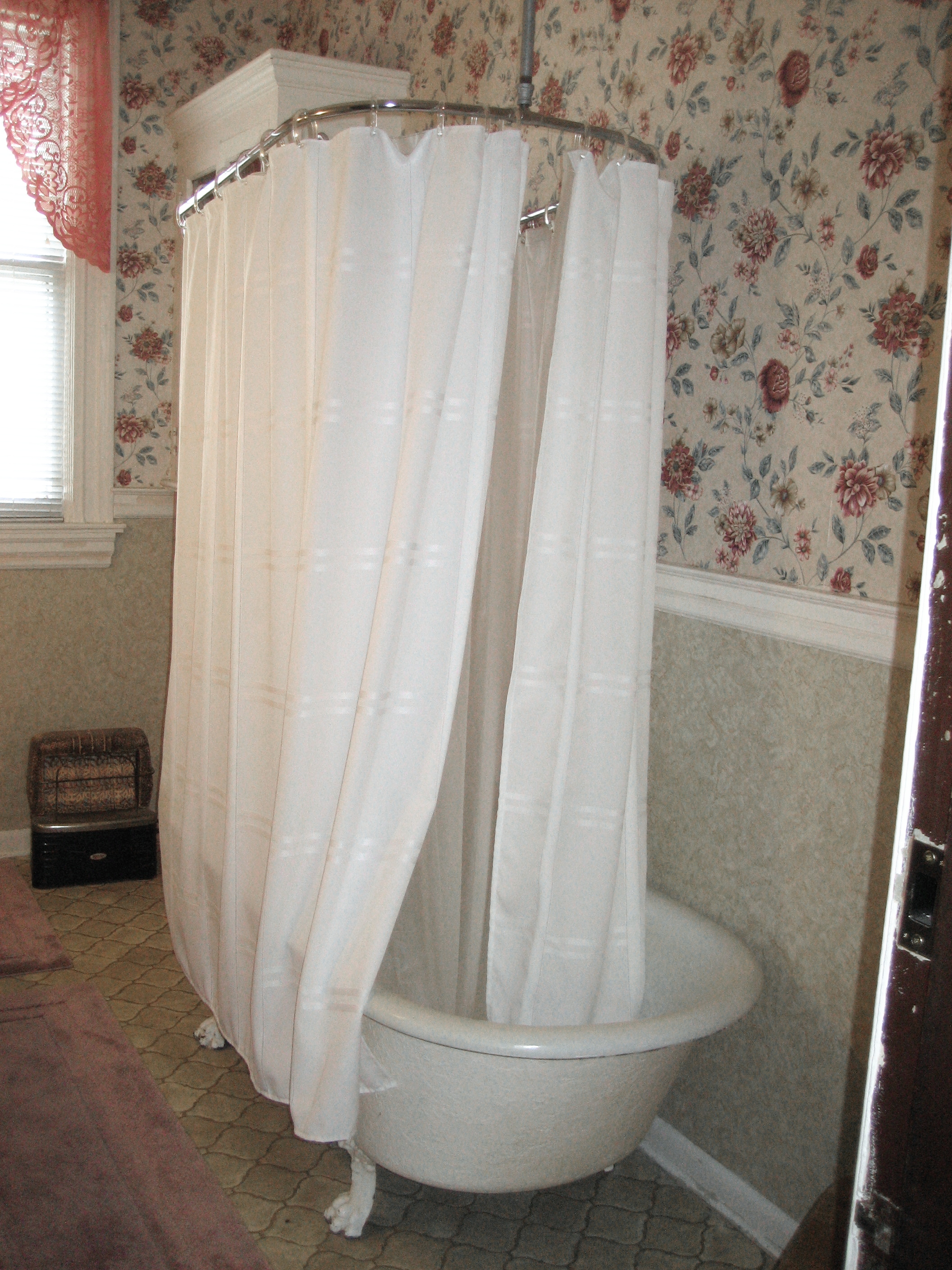
Circled bathtub rod and curtain

Bathtubs can use L-shaped or oval-shaped curtain rods, mainly when only one wall can be used.

== Construction ==
Curtain rods can be made of many materials including wood, metal and plastic. They are available in a variety of styles and designs. While many curtain rods are simple straight poles, there are also curved and hinged options. These designs facilitate installation in bay windows, around curved walls, and in corners. Prices and quality of curtain rods are as varied as designs from inexpensive big-box store products to high-end specialty products made by companies catering to interior designers and architects.

== Placement ==
Mounting a curtain rod high above a window can give the illusion that the window is much larger than it actually is.

== See also ==
- Curtain ring
- Shower curtain
