= Bouchara (trademark) =

French clothing store sign

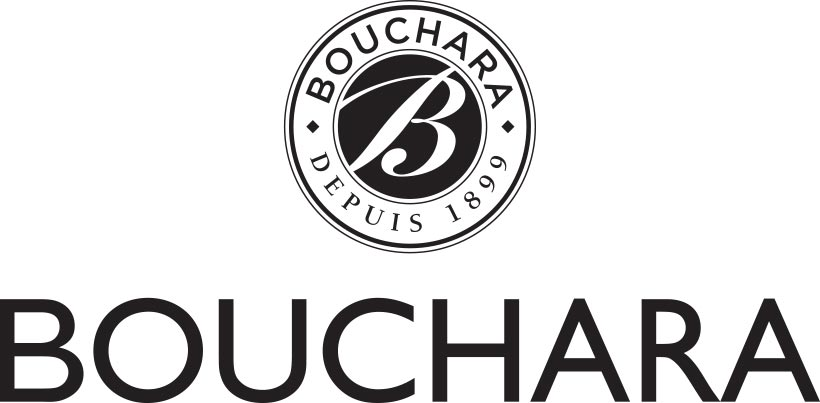
- Founded: 1899
- Founder: Jacques Bouchara
- Headquarters: Paris, France
- Website: www.bouchara.com

Bouchara is a French brand of household linen, furnishing fabric and decoration, founded in Marseille in 1899 by Jacques Bouchara. Bouchara sells decorative items, household linens, tableware, fabrics and interior clothing.

The brand is operated by the company Eurodif, a subsidiary of the Omnium Group managed by Robert Lascar.

== History ==
=== Origins of the company (1899-1991) ===
==== Beginnings ====
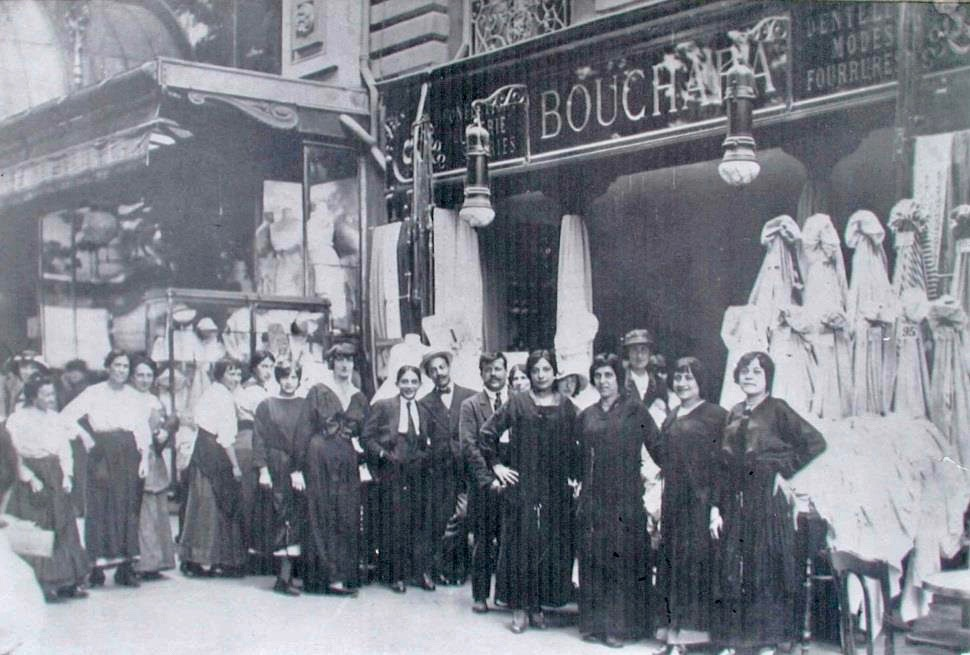
The Bouchara shop in Marseille

In 1899, Jacob Bouchara opened his first store in Marseille. His son, Charles Bouchara, offers the sale of « fabrics by the kilometer ».

Aziel Abrami, Charles Bouchara and Georges Molina launch the company « Bouchara », which sets up stores in Montpellier and Carcassonne. From the 1930s, the chain developed.

==== Establishment in France ====
During the 1930s, Bouchara established itself in various provincial towns and in Paris in 1935. Bouchara developed its purchases and its partnerships with the Lyon silk manufacturers.

A special wedding section called « le Blanc » has been created. The « Noir » department was launched with the success of the « petite robe noire » created by Mademoiselle Chanel. A drapery department for making men's suits is established.

Between 1939 and 1945, during the Second World War, stores were practically closed due to lack of supplies and occupation.

==== 1945-1969 ====
Between 1945 and 1969, the Parisian store expanded in the face of competition represented by the development of ready-to-wear. Bouchara sells fabrics by the meter for interior furnishing.

==== 1980s-1990s ====
New self-service departments such as mercery and patterns are appearing. In the 1980s, Bouchara sold furnishing fabrics in large widths for making curtains. At the beginning of the 1990s, Bouchara sold ready-to-hang curtains.

=== The company between 1992 and 2008 ===
==== Acquisition by Eurodif and Omnium ====
The Bouchara brand and points of sale changed shareholders in 1992. Another company, the Omnium Group, buys the company. From this date, the brand is also distributed in Eurodif points of sale which belong to the same group.

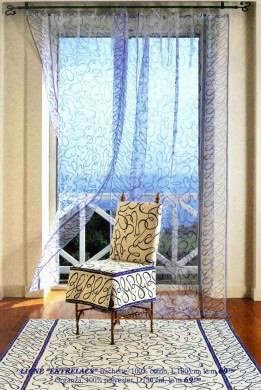
Garouste & Bonetti products, Bouchara Collection

==== Investments in household linen products ====
Bouchara is investing in the household linen market: Bouchara Collection, focused on bed linen, bathroom linen, table line...

Bouchara contracts with painters to produce fabrics. Two editions named « La Toile au Tissu » were offered for sale in 1996 and 1997. The third edition called « du Design au Tissu » was designed by Garouste & Bonetti.

==== Renovation of the Parisian store, opening of stores in the provinces ====
In 1995, the Parisian store was renovated. The department store in Paris moved in 1999 a few hundred meters away.

Points of sale in Bordeaux and Lille opened their doors in 1996, followed by Nantes, Toulouse and other French cities.

==== Actions in the 2000s ====
The company is launching training targeting sales and management professions in fabric and home textile stores, requiring technical knowledge different from ready-to-wear stores. Three types of stores are created (the shop, the classic, the megastore) and the locations are renovated.

In 2005, Bouchara offered the « Solution Mode by Bouchara » service, which combines tailor-made couture and ready-to-wear.

The parent company is experiencing financial difficulties due to another subsidiary of the group. From 2006, the group to which Bouchara belongs underwent a financial restructuring and sold thirteen points of sale.

In 2008, the Parisian department store closed its doors, but the brand was retained.

=== From 2009 to the present ===
==== Change of positioning ====
In 2009, the Bouchara brand modified its positioning and created the Bouchara Paris brand.

At the end of the first half of the same year, Bouchara opened a merchant site. The Bouchara Collection brand continues to be sold in Eurodif points of sale.

Bouchara sells a range of outdoor home textile products in a national chain.

==== Opening of Bouchara Boutique in Cannes ====
In June 2012, Bouchara Boutique reopened in Cannes.

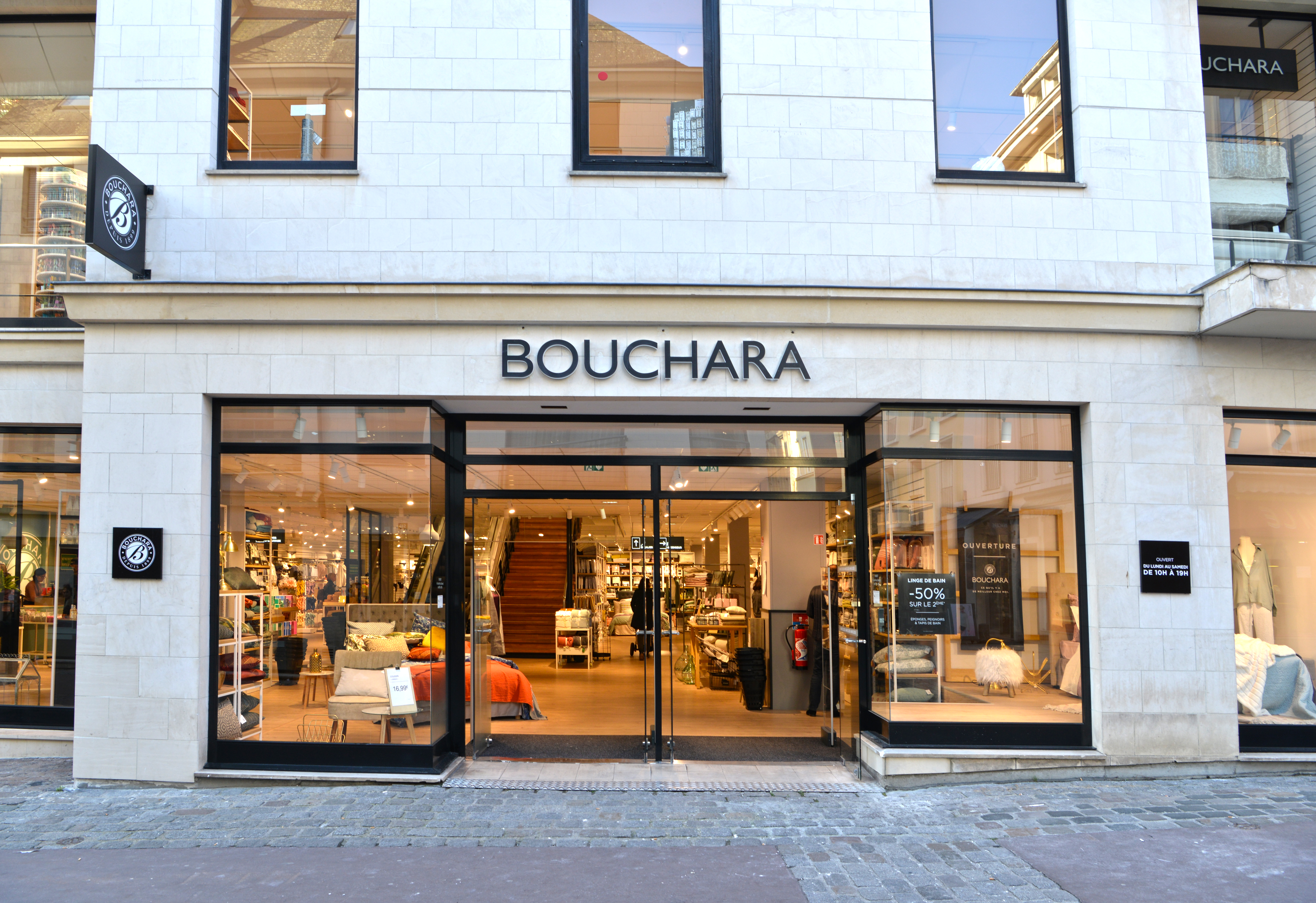
Bouchara store in Rouen.

==== Investments in new markets ====
In 2013, the brand marketed ranges of tableware and small decoration.

Bouchara is evolving and investing in new markets. The brand is changing its logo and developing capsules in various sectors such as lingerie, children's rooms and baby clothes.

==== Bouchara and the Eurodif company ====
Bouchara is present in France. This situation results from the partnership between the Bouchara brand and the Eurodif company, which is entrusted with the Bouchara brand license. The Eurodif company retains the operation and management of its network of points of sale.

In the fall of 2016, the Eurodif store in Dijon opened its doors. The majority of the 80 Eurodif stores were renamed Bouchara during the summer of 2017.

The Bouchara brand, by getting closer to its historic partner, opens a store in Rouen.

== Products ==
=== Evolution of the original offer ===
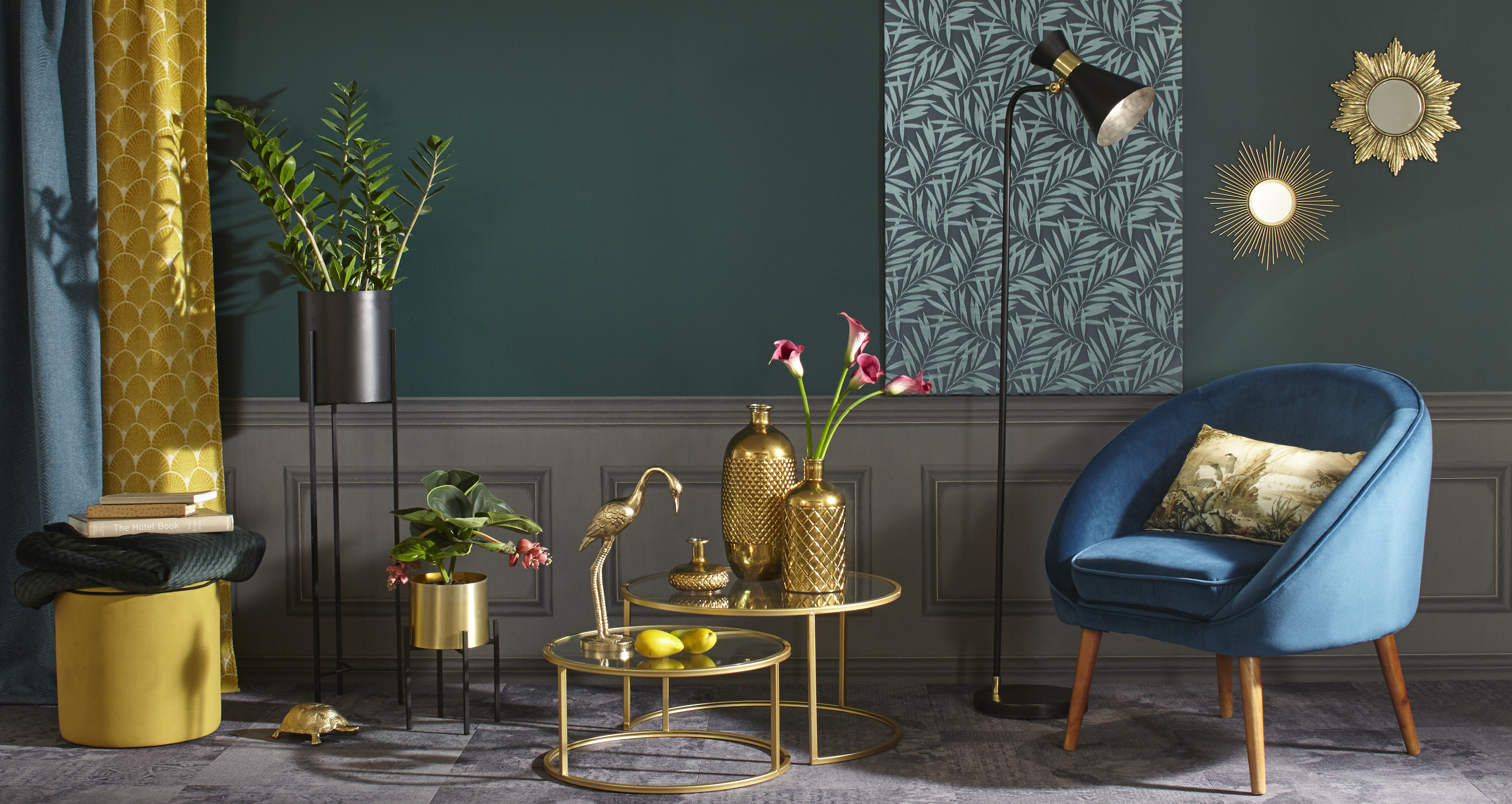
Bouchara Collection

The historical product line is fabric by the meter. Bouchara also develops window accessories, haberdashery, textiles and household linens, tableware, small decoration, children's bedrooms and nightwear.

=== Collaborations ===
From 1996, Bouchara concluded contracts for his collections with artists.

Since the creation of the company, Bouchara has distributed and sold toile de Jouy products. In 2011, a collaboration with the Musée des Impressions de Mulhouse was concluded.

=== Positioning of Bouchara in 2016 ===
Bouchara adopted a new positioning in 2016 in anticipation of the change of brand of Eurodif points of sale. The household linen and decoration offering remains central to the company's products.

== See also ==
=== Bibliography ===
- Chaumette, Xavier (2002). Tissus pour un siècle de mode, Les textiles et les modes féminines en France au xxe siècle (in French). pp. 85–95.
- Weidmann, Daniel (2015). Guide Pratique des Textiles, Tissés, Tricotés, techniques (in French).
- Walter, Marc; Riffel, Mélanie; Rouart, Sophie (2003). Citadelles et Mazenot (in French).
- Bonneville, Françoise (1993). Rêves de blanc, La grande histoire du linge de maison (in French). Flammarion.
- Smith, Alison (2009). L'encyclopédie de la couture (in French). Flammarion.
- Cardelus, David (1999). Le grand livre de la décoration intérieure (in French) (Place des Victoires ed.).
- Bouchara se prépare à changer de dimension (in French). Journal du Textile. 2017. p. 21.

=== Externals links ===
- Official website
