= Curtain ring =

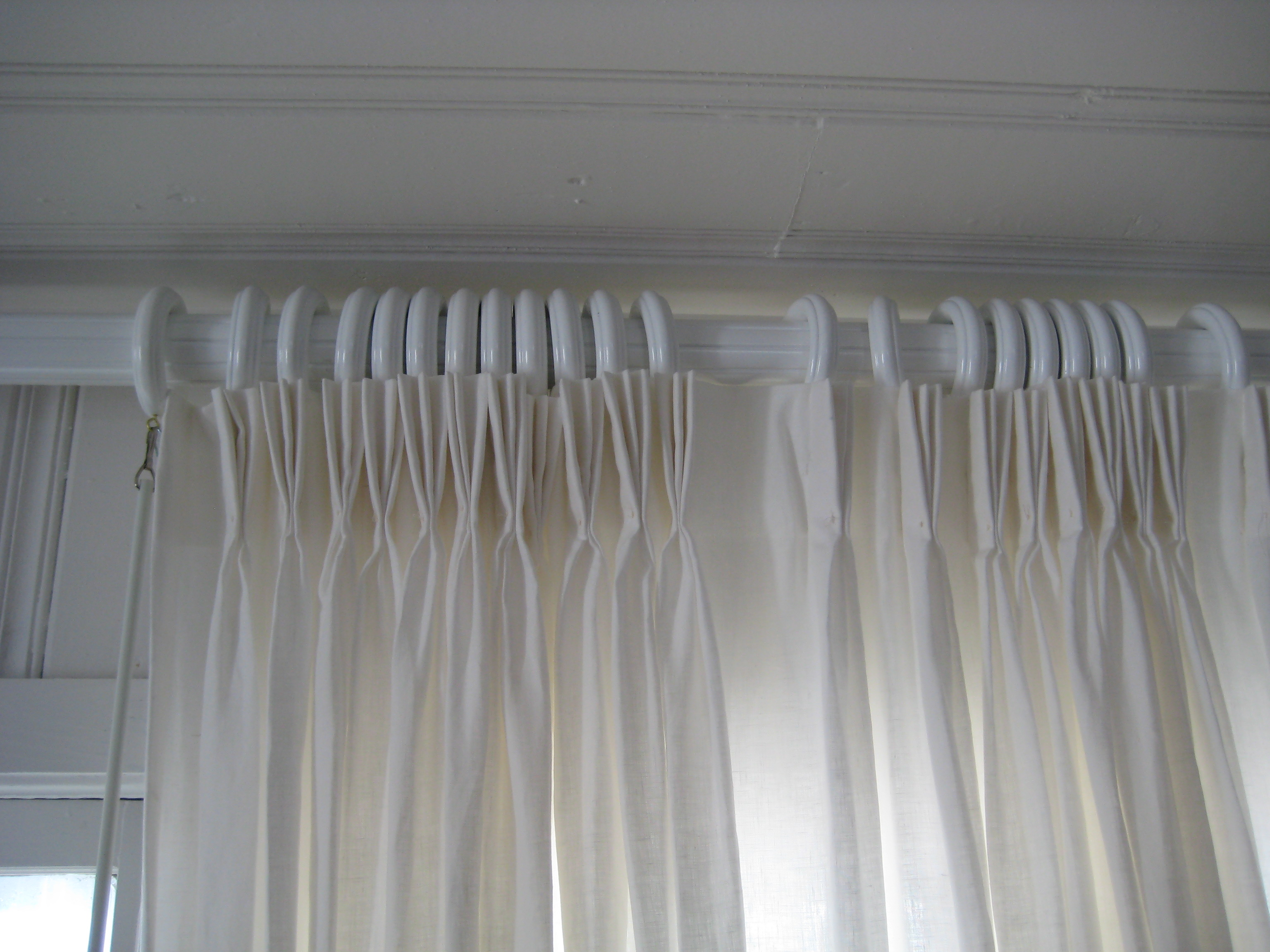
Curtain rings supporting a white linen curtain

A curtain ring is a small clip for suspending a curtain. They hold up curtains of all types, including shower curtains.

== Usage ==
The Romans used curtains hanging from poles with a few rings. Pliny's Natural History reports that the hard kernels of the cucus tree were turned to make the rings.

Lewis and Clark took three gross of curtain rings with them on their famous expedition to the Pacific coast in 1804, expecting to give them as presents to the natives of the North American interior.

In the 19th century, Mr Rees designed a curtain ring which would not catch upon the curtain rail and so would go smoothly around curves and corners.

Such rings may be used as improvisations in other ways. For example, they may be used as a wedding ring to solemnise a marriage ceremony; or as a ligature to prevent nocturnal enuresis (bedwetting). Other uses include hanging a hammer from one's belt or attaching one's gloves or canteen to one's sleeping bag while camping when not using a backpack.

The 1987 film Planes, Trains and Automobiles has a character played by John Candy who is a curtain ring salesman. His ability to sell the rings for their alternate uses (e.g., large earrings) is central to the plot of the film.

== See also ==
- Curtain rod
- Drapery hook
