= Cleanability =

Property of materials

Cleanability is a term used to describe a material's ability to have contaminants removed such as residue, stains, deposits, microorganisms, and dust. The term is applicable to materials used in the production of surfaces, tools, utensils, etc, that come into contact with media such as food, chemicals, or bio-hazardous materials that must be removed from the implements to prevent possible contamination of other media during later use. Highly cleanable materials will transfer little to no media from one batch to another if proper cleaning procedures are followed.

== Requirements ==
In order to ensure optimum cleanability of the surfaces of machines and equipment, they must fulfill certain requirements. Where surfaces come into contact with media, no deposits may be formed which could impair product quality. Therefore, the surface roughness of such areas should be below 0.8 μm. If the degree of roughness is exceeded, resistances may develop during disinfection processes. These occur when microorganisms only come into contact with disinfectants but are not killed by them.

== Standard ==
When ascertaining the cleanability of a surface with regard to particles, the analysis can be carried out in correlation with the surface cleanliness classes described in VDI 2083 Part 9.1. Surface roughness can be measured, for example, using profile methods (DIN EN ISO 11562) or AFM (atomic force microscope). However, no norm is currently in existence which describes a standardized AFM procedure.
