= Curtain =

Cloth or other material used to block out light

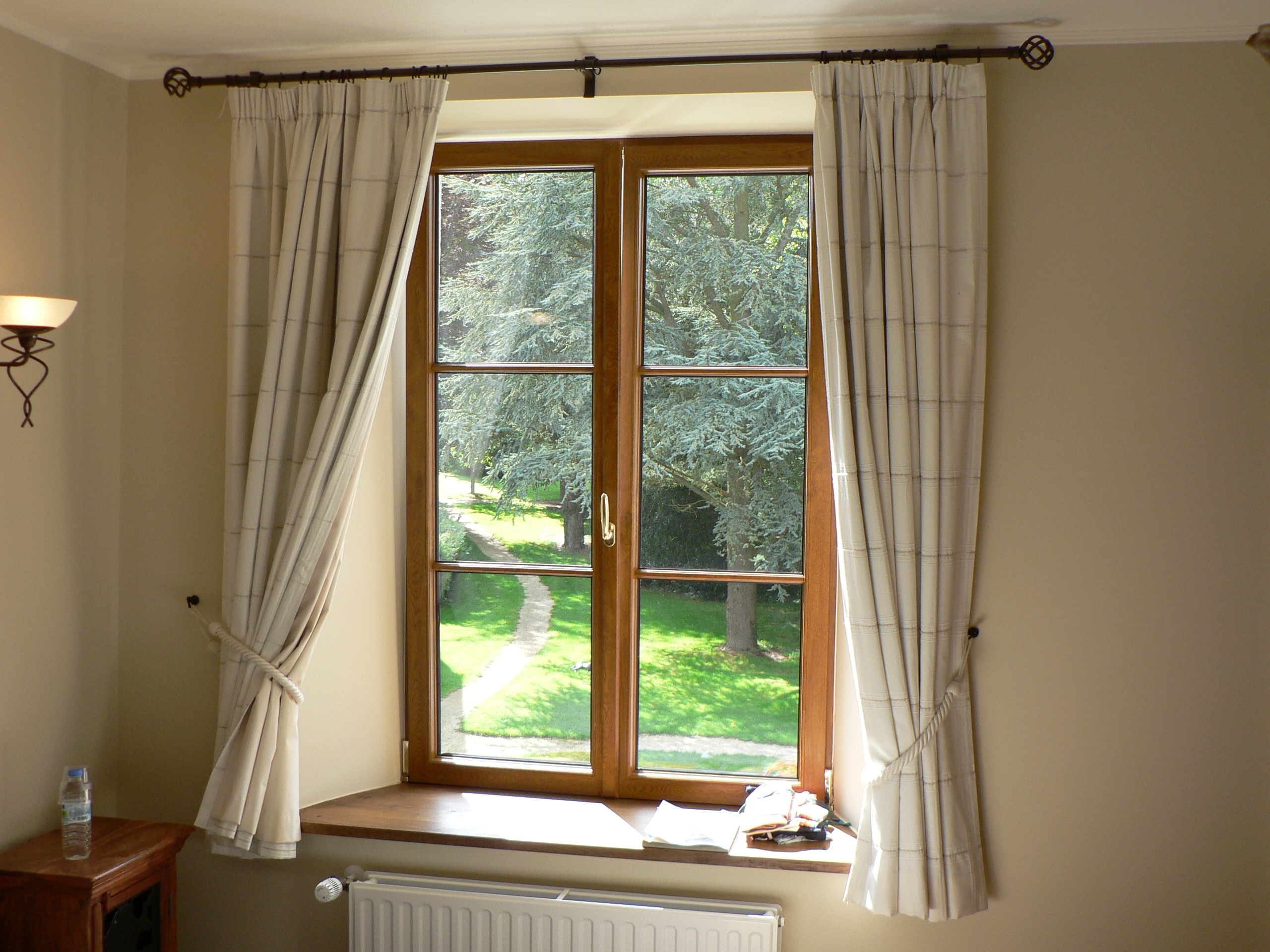
Typical curtains for a window

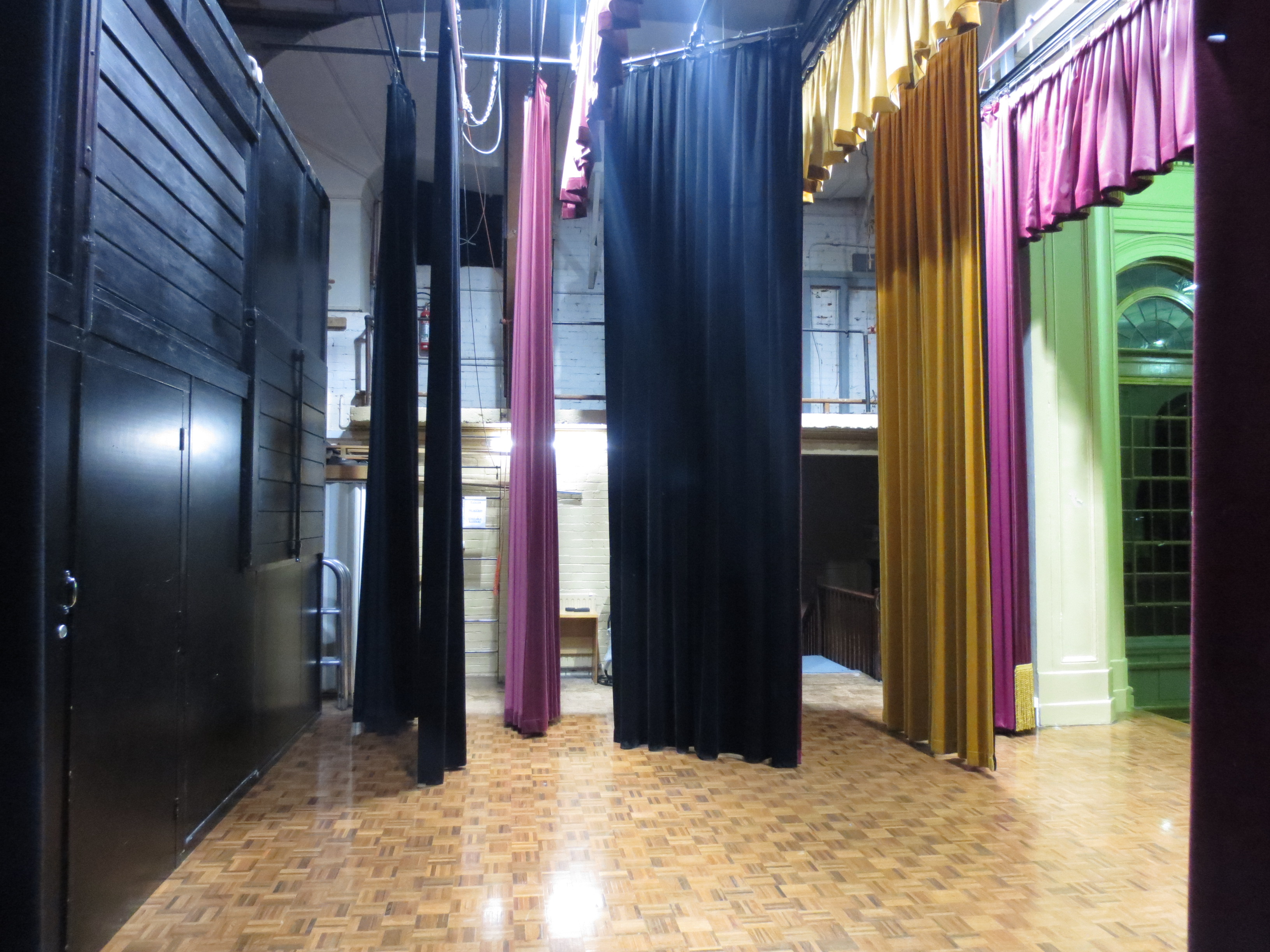
Theatre curtains on a small stage (Canberra Albert Hall, 2016)

A curtain is a piece of cloth or other material intended to block or obscure light, air drafts, or (in the case of a shower curtain) water.

Curtains are often hung on the inside of a building's windows to block the passage of light. For instance, at night to aid sleeping, or to stop light from escaping outside the building (stopping people outside from being able to see inside, often for privacy reasons). In this application, they are also known as draperies. Curtains hung over a doorway are known as portières. Curtains come in a variety of shapes, materials, sizes, colors, and patterns. They often have their own sections within department stores, while some shops are completely dedicated to selling curtains.

Theater drapes and stage curtains serve a number of sound-absorbing and light-blocking functions, such as the front curtain that separates the stage from the auditorium, and other curtains and drapes that serve as backdrops or to obscure offstage areas.

Curtains vary according to cleanability, ultraviolet light deterioration, oil and dust retention, noise absorption, fire resistance, and life span. Curtains may be operated by hand, with cords, by press-button pads or remote-controlled computers. They are held out of the way of the window by means of curtain tie-backs. Measuring curtain sizes needed for each window varies greatly according to the type of curtain needed, window size, and type and weight of curtain.

Curtains are a form of window decor and complete the overall appearance of the interior of the house. Curtains help control the ambiance and flow of natural light into the room. The effect of drapery or curtains is best seen in daylight, and with proper indoor light positioning, can look attractive even at night.

== History ==
From evidence found in excavation sites at Olynthus, Pompeii and Herculaneum, portieres, a curtain hung over a doorway, appear to have been used as room dividers in classic antiquity. Mosaics from the 2nd to 6th century show curtains suspended from rods spanning arches.

=== England ===
In England, curtains began to replace wooden shutters towards the end of the 16th century.. Window curtains were rare in 17th century England and were found only in grand homes rather than a common presence in every house. Shutters would be used on first and second floor windows for privacy reasons, in townhouses. As keeping out the cold was a constant worry, special window cloths would sometimes be hooked into window recess at night to keep out cold draughts.

In medieval England, the earliest form of window treatments were leather panels threaded onto iron rods. These were eventually replaced with woven wool panels. During the reign of Elizabeth I, ornately decorated Italian Renaissance fabrics, including brocades, velvets, and damask, began to be imported. These ornate fabrics, as well as fabrics decorated with jeweled embroidery, were used in curtains during the English Elizabethan and Jacobean periods. Solid wood shutters were used during cold seasons.

=== Fatimid Caliphate ===
In the Fatimid Caliphate, a curtain known as a stir ("veil") was used to conceal the caliph at the beginning of an audience session (majlis). A servant known as the ṣāḥib al-sitr (or muṭawallī al-sitr) would then pull it back to reveal the caliph seated on his throne. The sahib al-sitr was also combined with the duties of chamberlain, master of ceremonies, and bearer of the caliph's sword, and was often chosen from among mamluks from saqaliba backgrounds.

=== Indian Subcontinent ===
Khus curtains or curtains made from vetiver (Chrysopogon zizanioides) are eco-friendly cooling agents. It is both a curtain and a cooling device before technology brought in air coolers. Up until the 1990s middle class families in the subcontinent would use khus curtains to cool their rooms as it was affordable and easily accessible. The technology of khus curtain is simple. the screen is sprayed with water and when wind blows in a well ventilated space the evaporation that subsequently occurs, cools the room down. A modified version of this was built in the form of a metal contraption later where the khus mats were fitted into slatted sides and accompanied by built in fans. Abul Fazl supposedly wrote in his book 'Ain-i-Akbari, that it was the Mughal emperor, Akbar, himself who first devised the system of using khus mats as cooling screens. During the 18th century, khus screens would signify privilege and they even appear in paintings depicting Rajput rulers according to Houghteling.

== Light and heat control and insulation ==
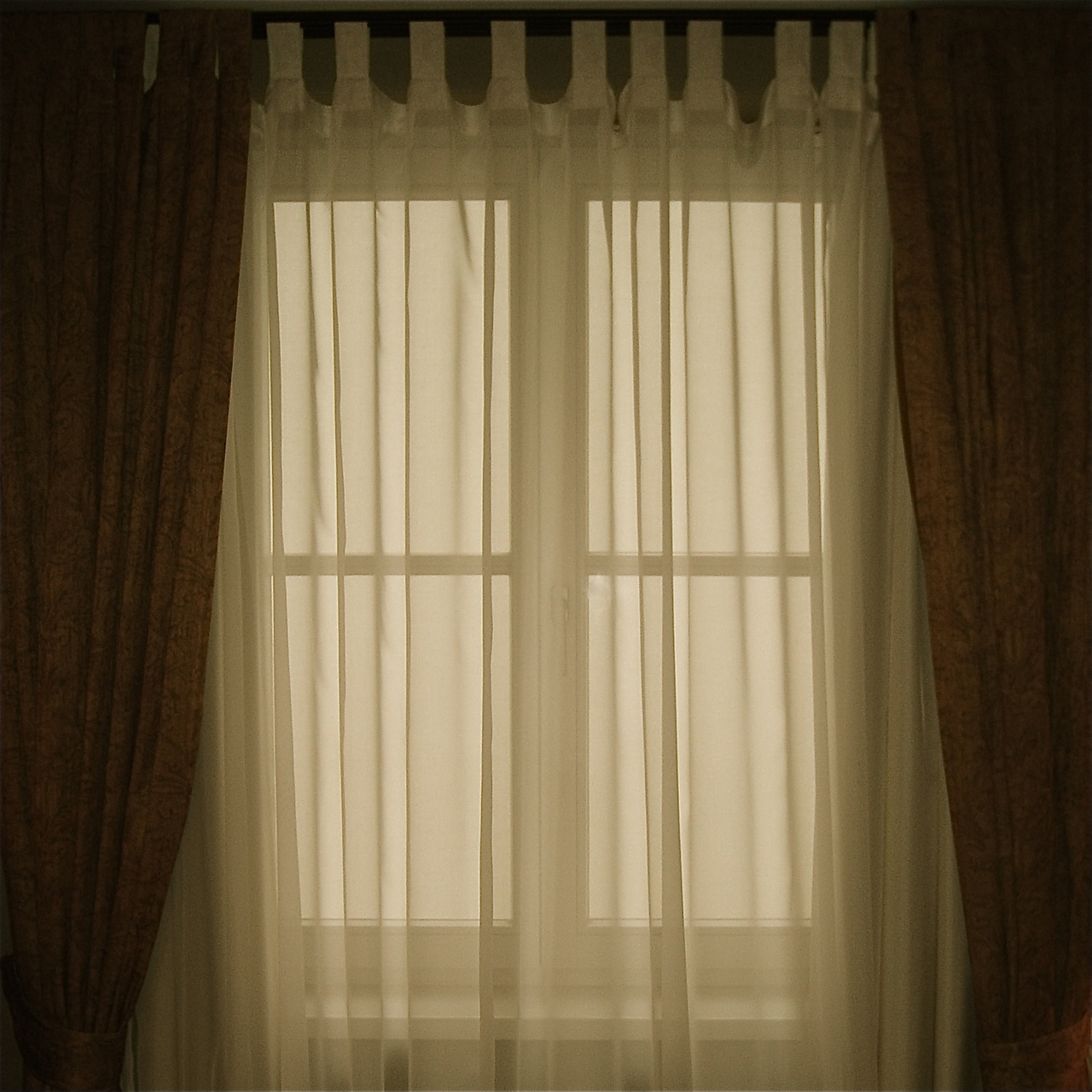
Translucent curtains hung on a window

Curtains are manufactured from a variety of thick fabrics, each with a differing degree of light absorption and heat insulating qualities. For maximum temperature control, the curtain gap to the window should be small, with minimum convection drafts below or above the curtain. Various architectural structures around the curtain can minimize these air drafts, but usually they are just used for decoration and make rooms feel more cozy.

A sheer or net curtain is one that is made from translucent fabric, such as a loosely woven polyester voile, silk or nylon made marquisette or ninon, and cotton lace, etc. Sheer curtains allow a majority of light to be transmitted through the fabric, with the fabric weave providing a basic level of UV protection while retaining maximum visibility outward through the curtain. Sheer curtains are sometimes referred to as "privacy curtains" in reference to their screening abilities; during the day most sheer fabrics will allow people inside the home to see the outside view while preventing people outside the home from seeing directly into the home. Due to the loose weave in sheer fabrics, these types of curtains offer very little in the way of heat insulation.

Uncoated fabrics provide the next level of heat insulation and light absorption. Uncoated fabrics constitute the vast majority of fabrics used in curtains, and are composed of a tightly woven fabric, most typically a cotton/polyester blend, which is mostly opaque when viewed in ambient light. Uncoated fabrics provide a reasonable level of heat insulation due to their tight weaves, but are too thin to completely absorb strong light. As a result, when curtains made from uncoated fabrics are closed in an attempt to block out direct sunlight, light will still be visible through the curtain because its textiles are shiny.

Coated fabrics consist of a standard uncoated fabric with an opaque rubber backing applied to the rear of the fabric to provide improved light absorption. To create a coated fabric, a liquefied rubber polymer is applied in a single coat to an uncoated fabric and subsequently fused dry by means of a heated roller, in much the same way that a laser printer applies toner to a sheet of paper before fusing it dry. A fabric that has been through the coating process once is considered a "1-pass-coated" fabric, anecdotally referred to as "dim-out" or "blackout" because of the fabric's ability to absorb approximately 50-70% of a direct light source. To improve the light absorption of a fabric it is possible to re-coat a fabric up to a maximum of "3-pass-coated", which is considered sufficient to block out 100% of a direct light source, hence such fabrics are referred to as "blackout-coated".

Maximum light absorption and heat insulation in a curtain is created through a lined curtain, which typically consists of an uncoated fabric at the front to provide the look and feel of the curtain, with a separate coated fabric attached at the rear to provide the insulative qualities. The coated fabric is typically referred to as a lining, which simply refers to a coated fabric that does not have any particular color or pattern.

Curtains may be held back with tie-backs (a loop of cloth, cord, etc., placed around a curtain to hold it open to one side; typically passed through a ring on a hook attached to the wall, and fastened with a knot, button, or velcro; often adorned with tassels) or may be closed and opened with sticks called draw-pulls (rods made of plastic, wood, or metal that can be twisted and/or pulled) or curtain rods which are attached either to the runner or to the first hook. A curtain hook stopper is a device used to stop the curtain from falling off the end of the curtain rail.

Although some curtains may employ pulley systems, they should not be confused with roller blinds or roller shades. They may be generally referred to as window treatments, which are cover or modification of the window, often with the aim to enhance the aesthetics of the window and the room.

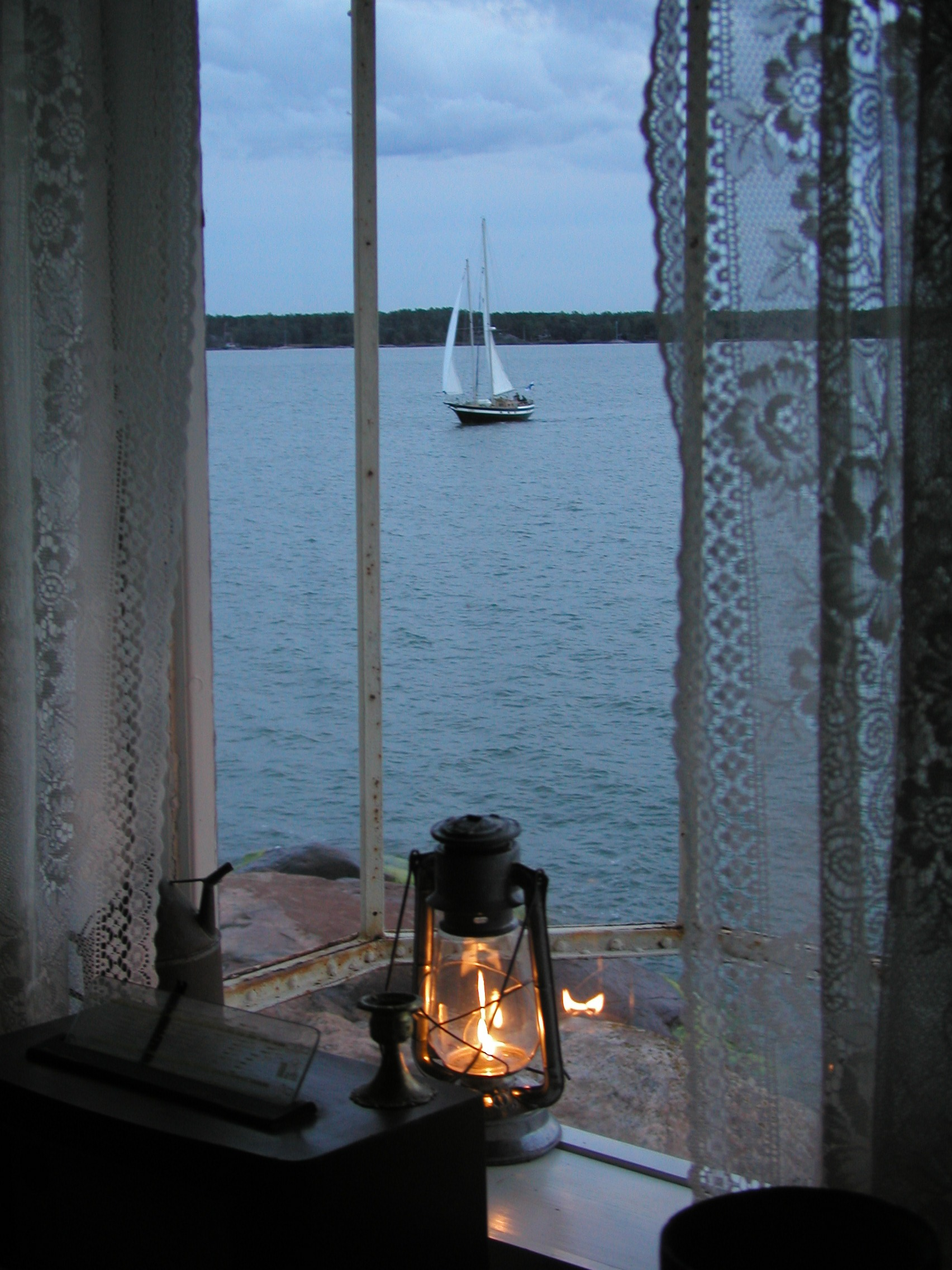
Curtains in a window opening to the sea

== Styles ==
Curtains can be used to give a room a focal point. There are at least twenty different styles of curtains and draperies which can be used in window treatment.

- Flat panel curtains are simple and versatile: to make them, pieces of fabric are hemmed on all four edges and the final rectangular or square piece is hung from curtains poles with clip-on rings or something similar. If pleated, the look is strongly influenced by the fullness of the pleats.
- Panel Pair Curtains are also known as double panel curtains. They refer to two curtain panels hanging on either side of the window. This is the most common style.
- Tab top curtains are made with narrow straps, that loop or tie at the top edge and hung from the curtain pole. This curtain style is often designed as two stationary panels at the sides of a window.
- Grommet curtains are hung by threading the curtain pole through a hole in the top of the fabric. This could be either a cut-out hole with the edges finished by a row of stitching or it could use a grommet to prevent fraying.
- Sash curtains are used to cover the lower sash of the windows.
- Rod pocket curtains have a channel sewn into the top of the fabric. A curtain rod is passed through the channel to hang.
- Thermal or blackout curtains use very tightly woven fabric, usually in multiple layers. They not only block out the light, but can also serve as an acoustic or thermal dampener.
- Animal Skin Curtains are sewn together from the skins of animals. Some are made from a single large animal, or the scraps of many small. Although not used in modern times, they were prominent in the Middle Ages, with many significant royal figures known to have animal skin curtains made from rare specimens.
- Curtain liners are used to protect actual curtains from getting wet.
- Eyelet Curtains are attached to a pole (usually metal). A number of circular holes are cut into near the top of the curtain and edged with a metal ring (eyelet). The pole is then threaded through these holes, with approx. 4 cm of fabric showing above the pole.
- Pencil Pleat Curtains are formed by pulling cords attached to "rufflette tape" to gather the fabric into pleats that look like a row of pencils. These curtains are then hung under a pole or attached to a curtain track with plastic hooks fitted in every 4th "pocket" along the rufflette heading. Typically a 1.5 m width of fabric will be gathered to 750 mm width. Rufflette Tape was originally developed from tape which held ammunition (bullets) for semi automatic machine guns.
- Pinch Pleat Curtains are usually formed by machine stitching together either 2 or 3 pleats, then leaving a gap of typically 10 cm before repeating the pleating process. These curtains are then hung under a curtain pole using either metal pinch pleat hooks or vertical sliding plastic hooks sewn into the reverse of the pleats.

== Gallery ==
Curtains

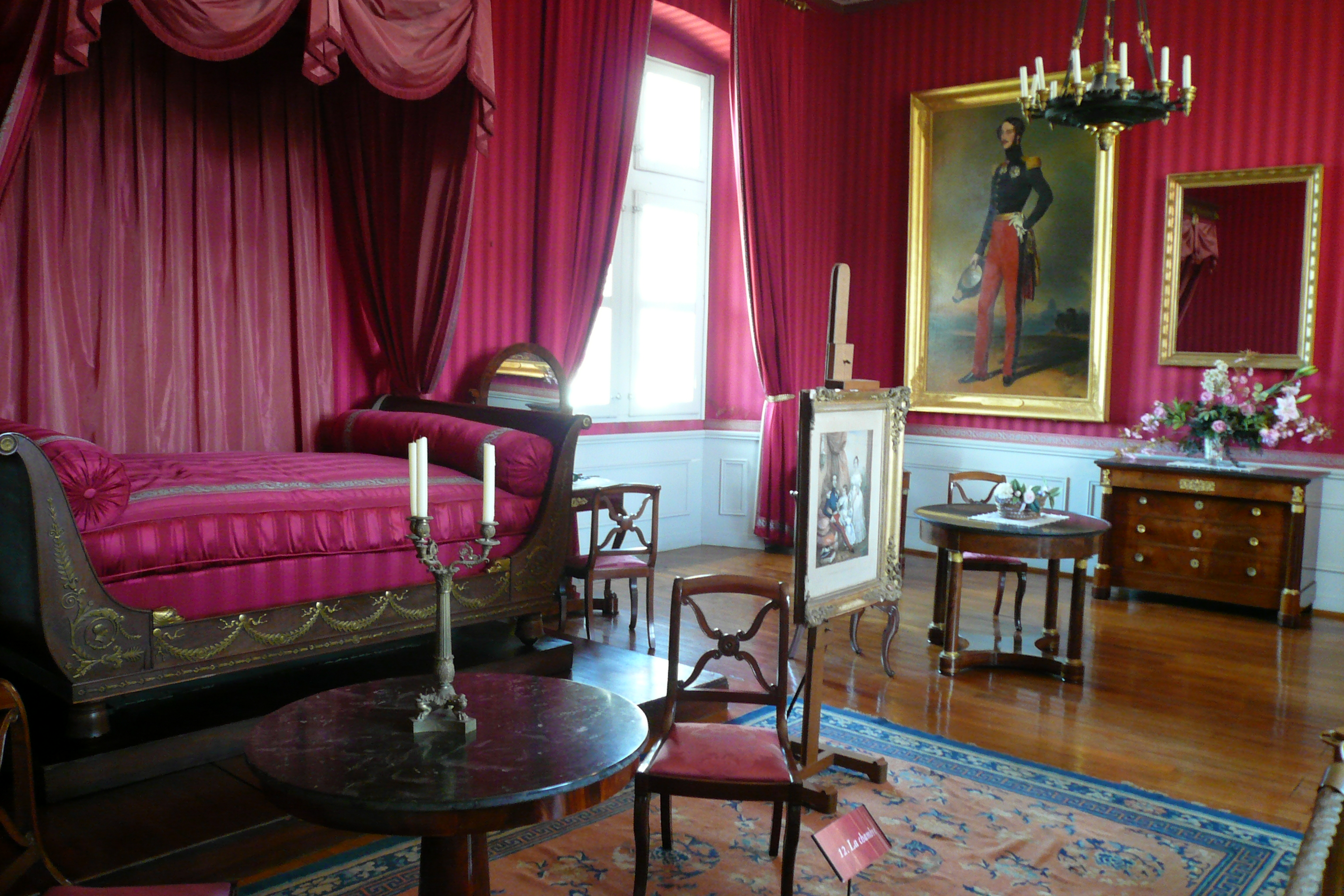
Chateaud Amboise

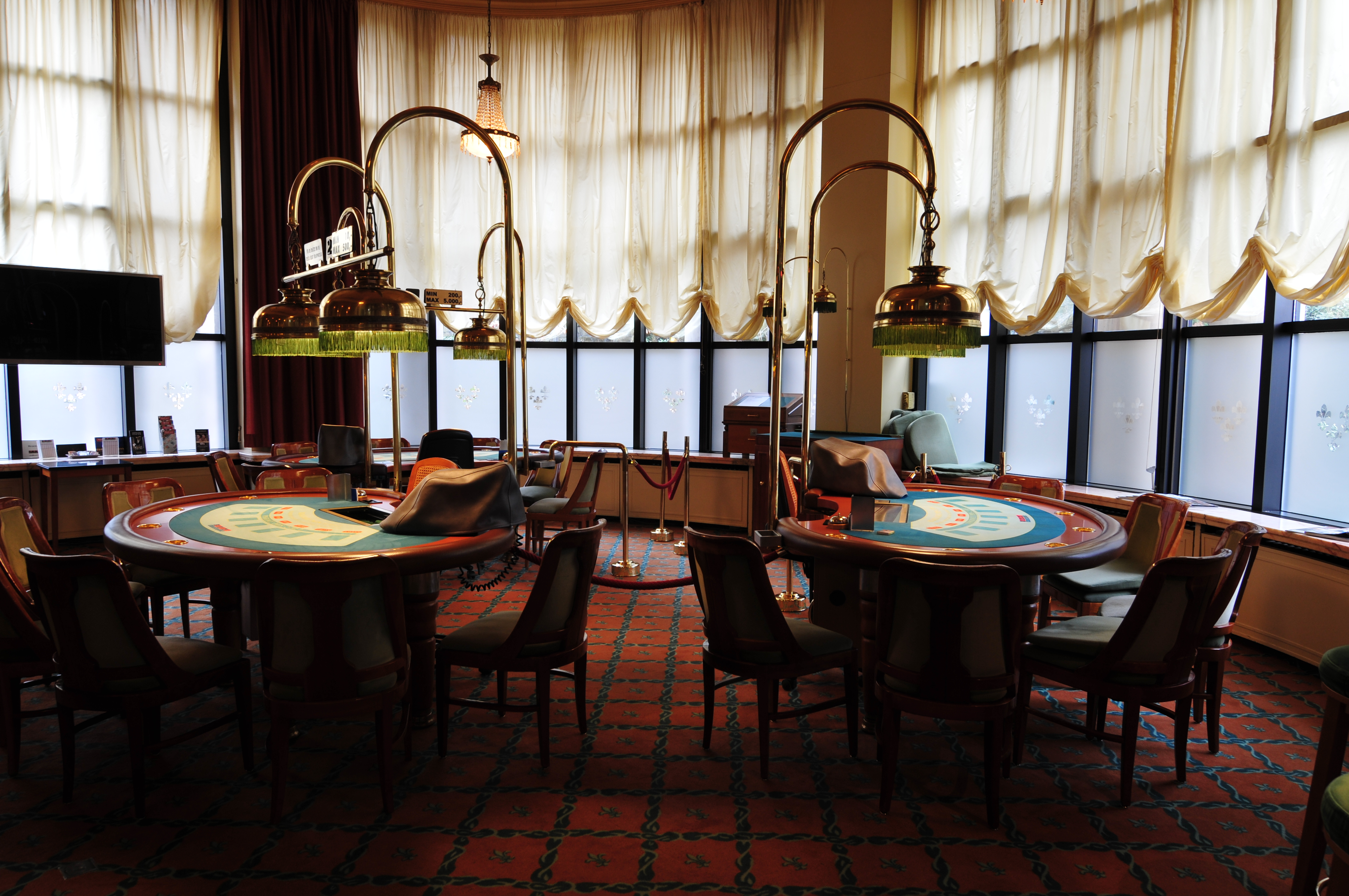
Austrian blinds

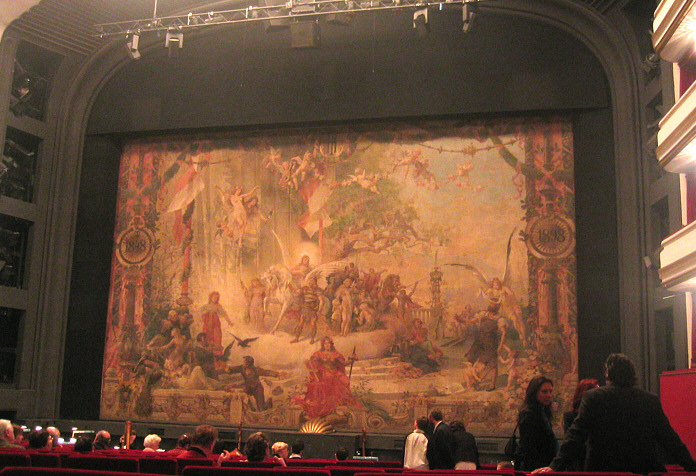
Safety curtain in a theater

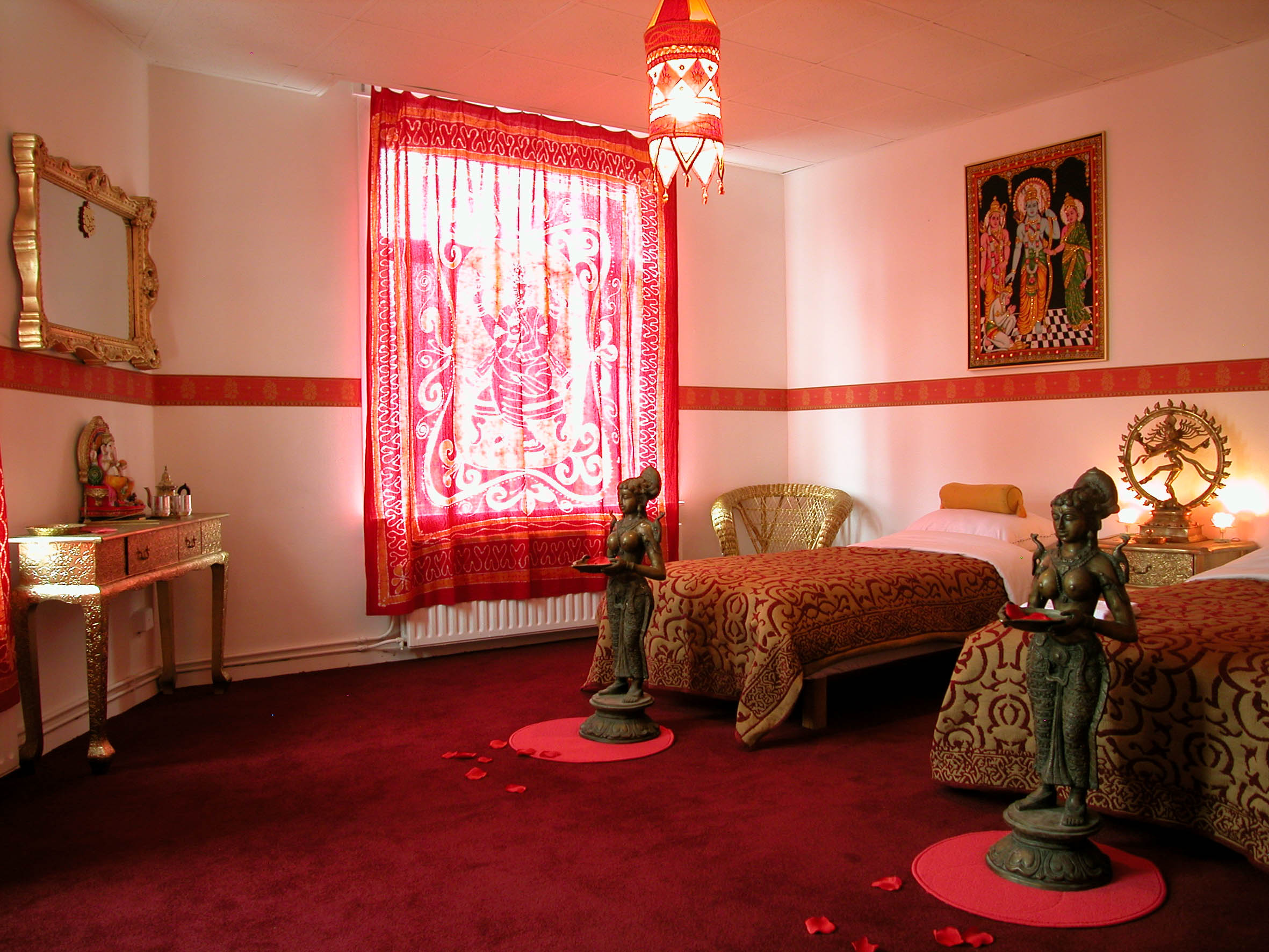
Hotel Transvaal

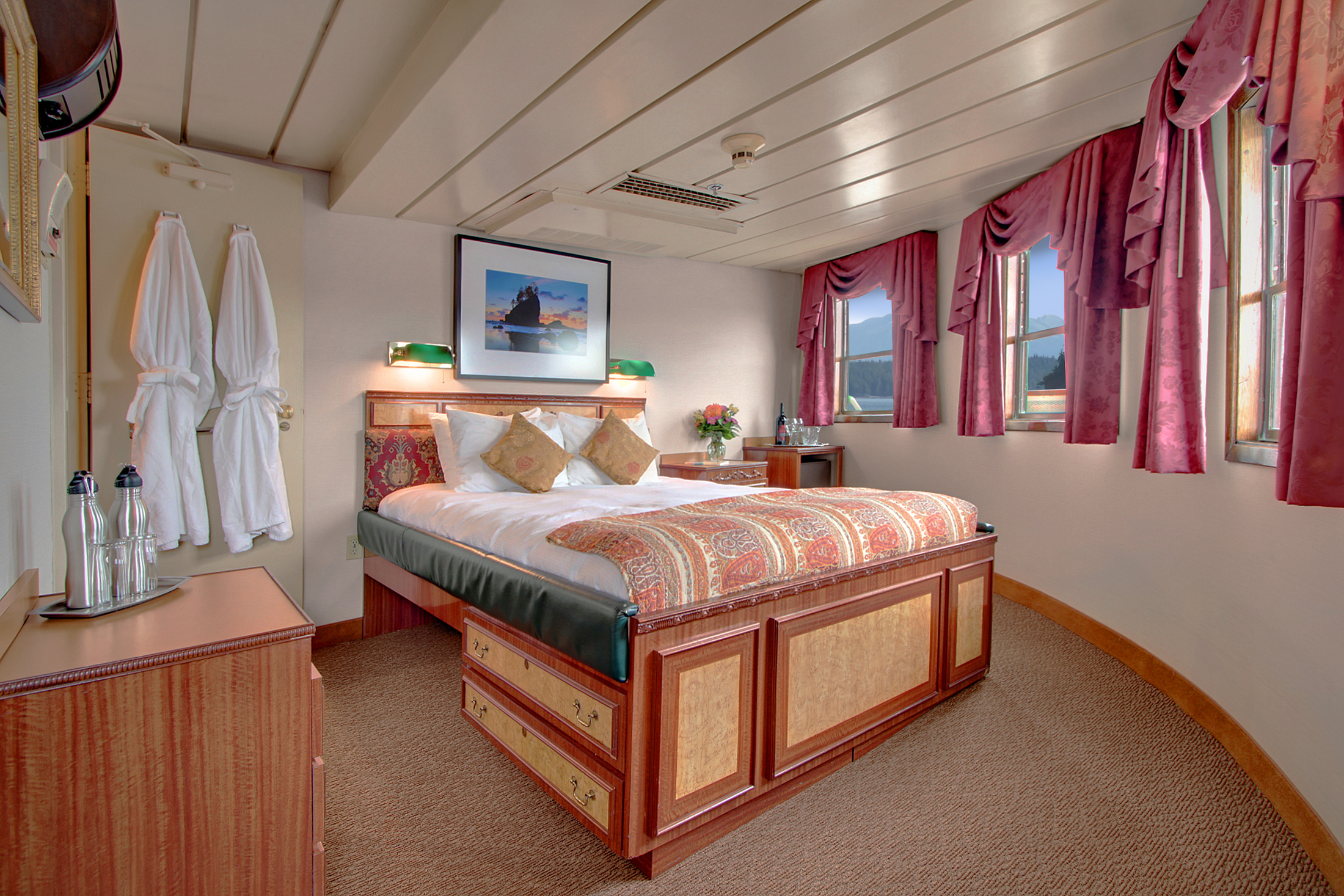

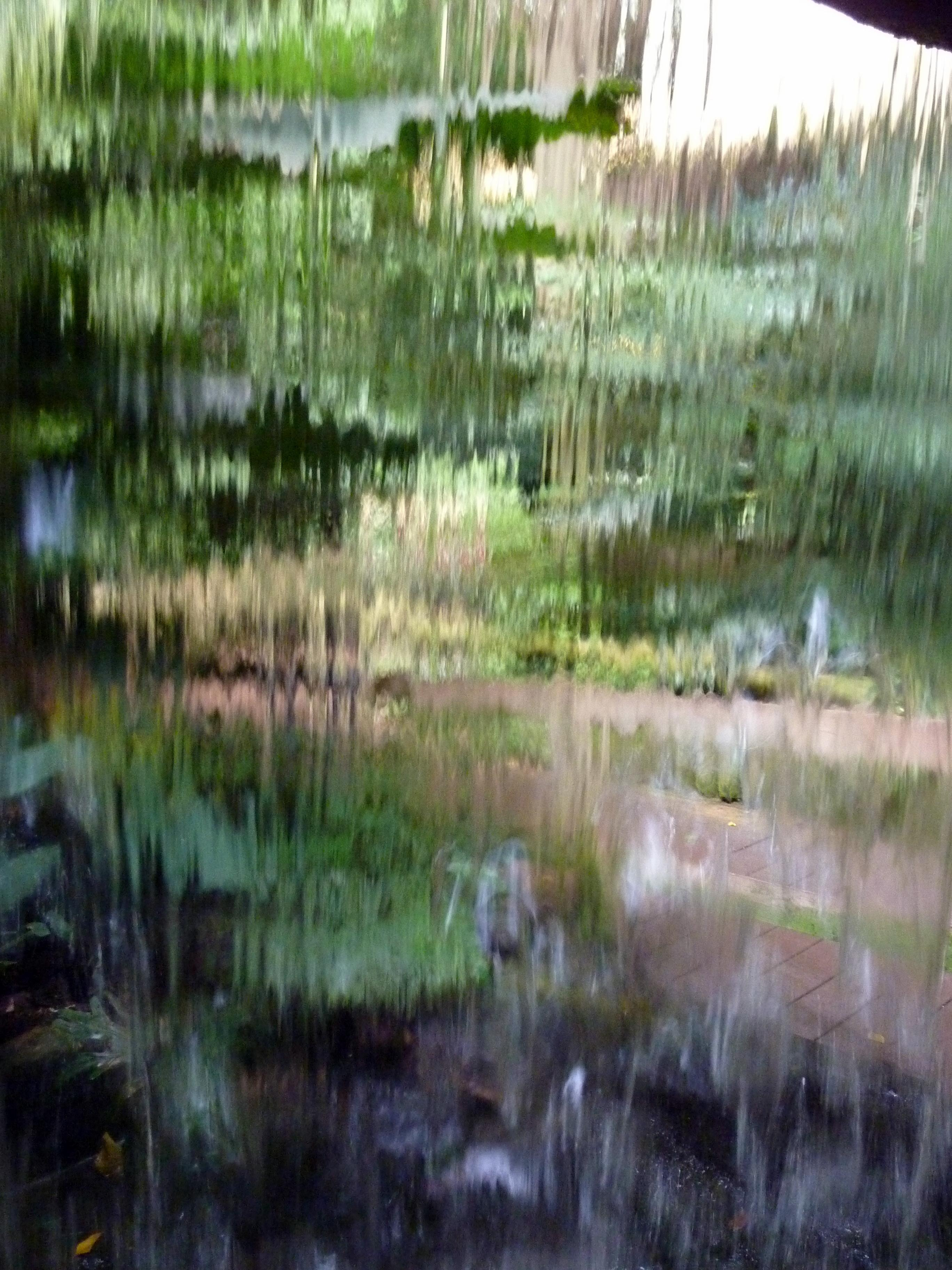
Waterfall curtain

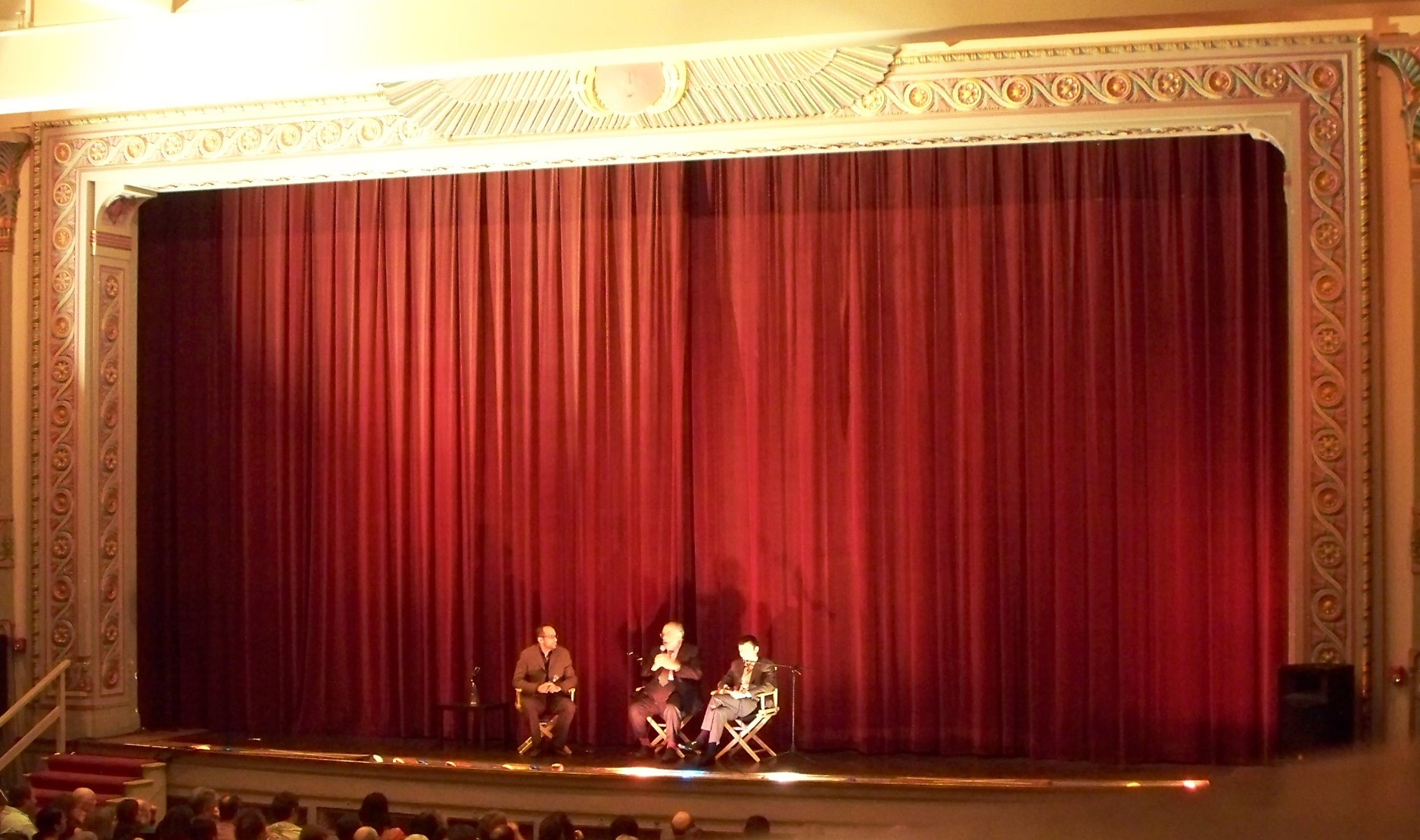
Main curtain used as a backdrop at a cinema

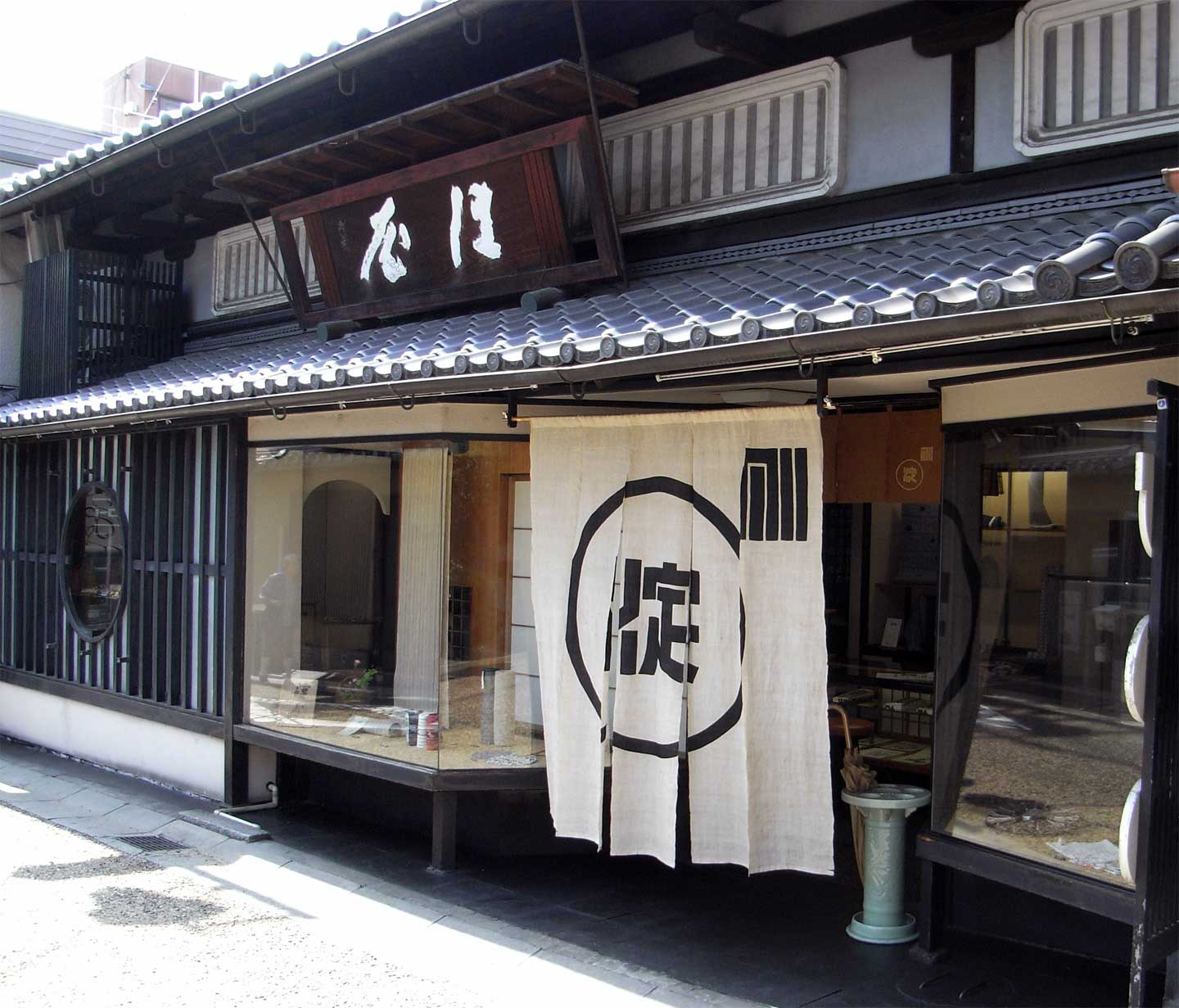
Noren (Japanese curtain) at an onsen

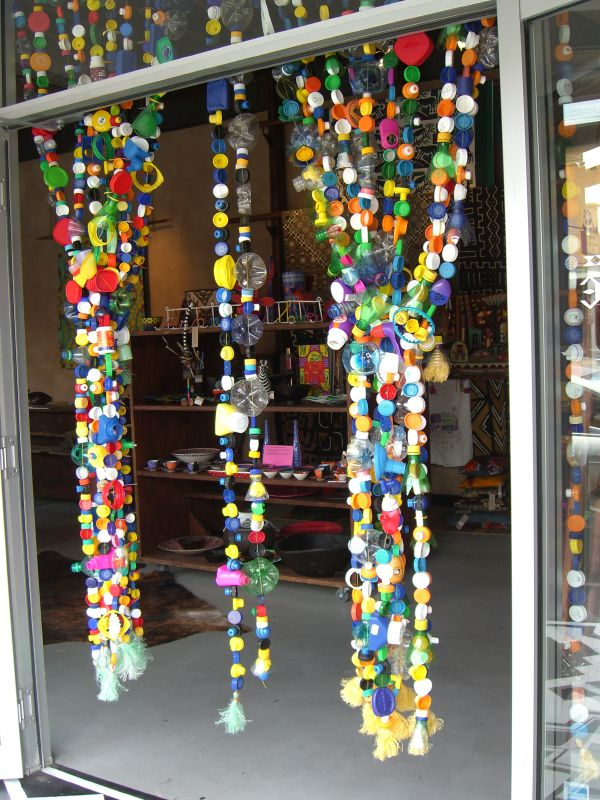
Bottle top curtain

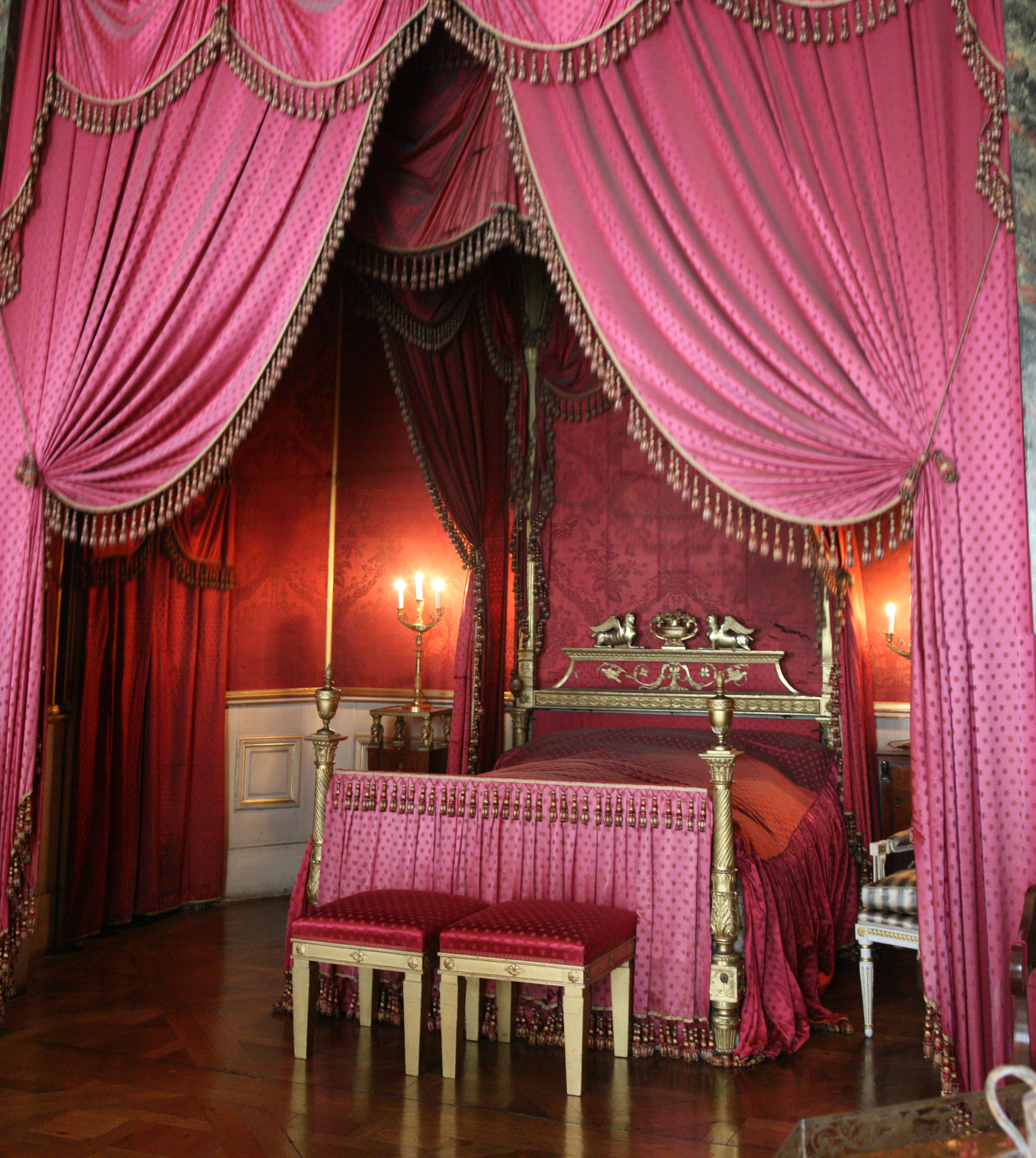
Bedroom of Queen Charlotte Mathilde

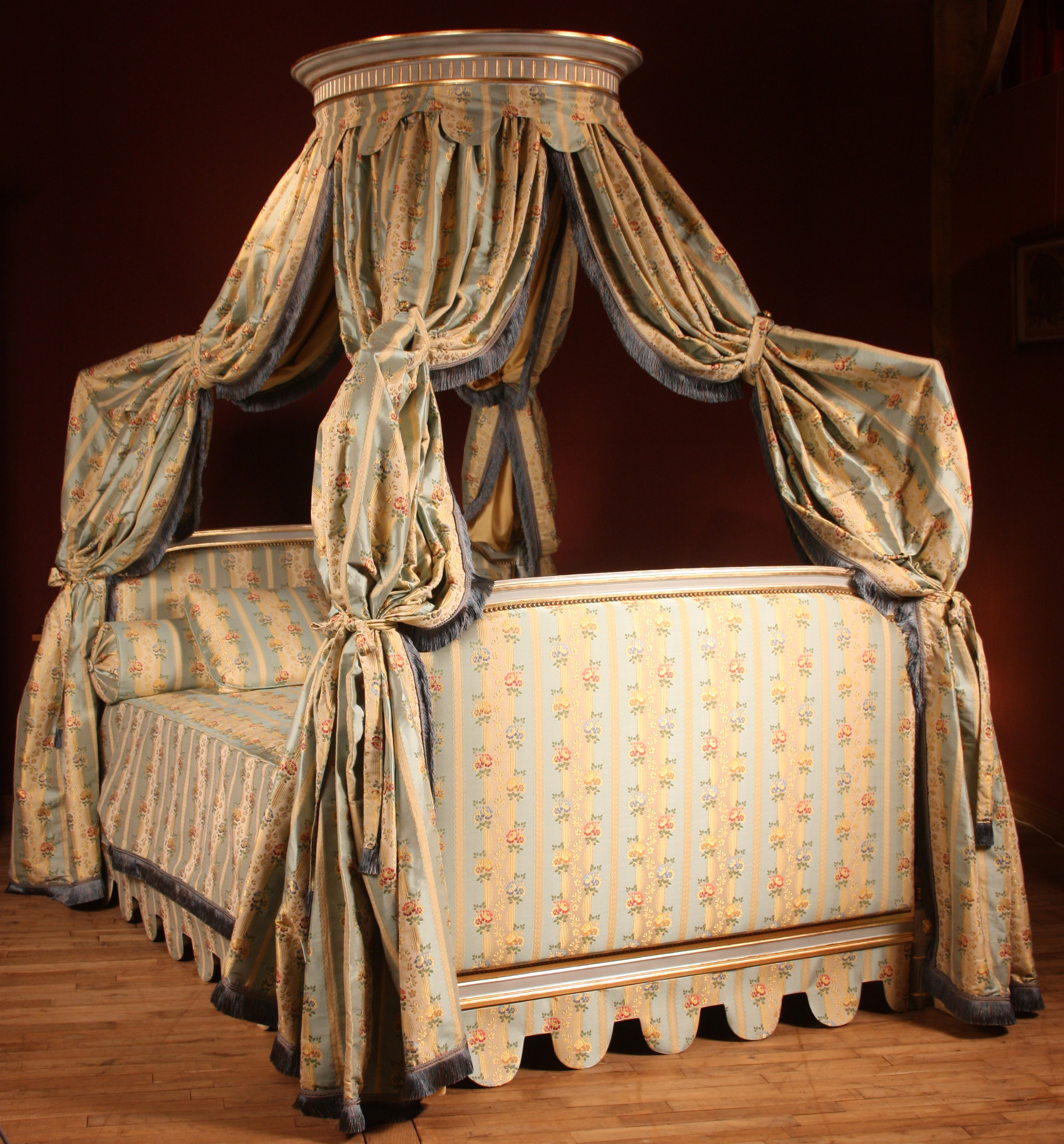
Bed with baldachin

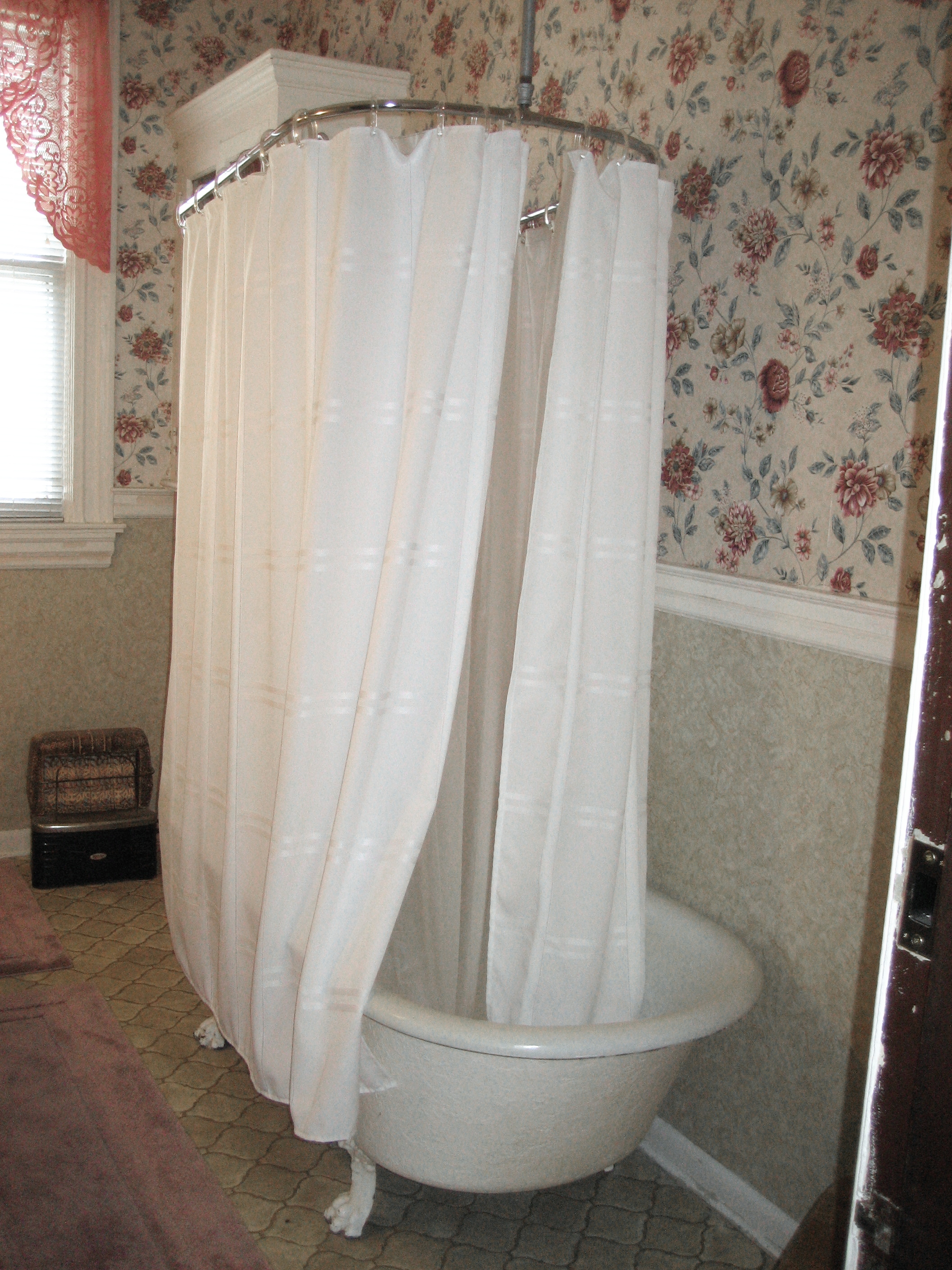
Bathtub with curtain at the Bernheimer House

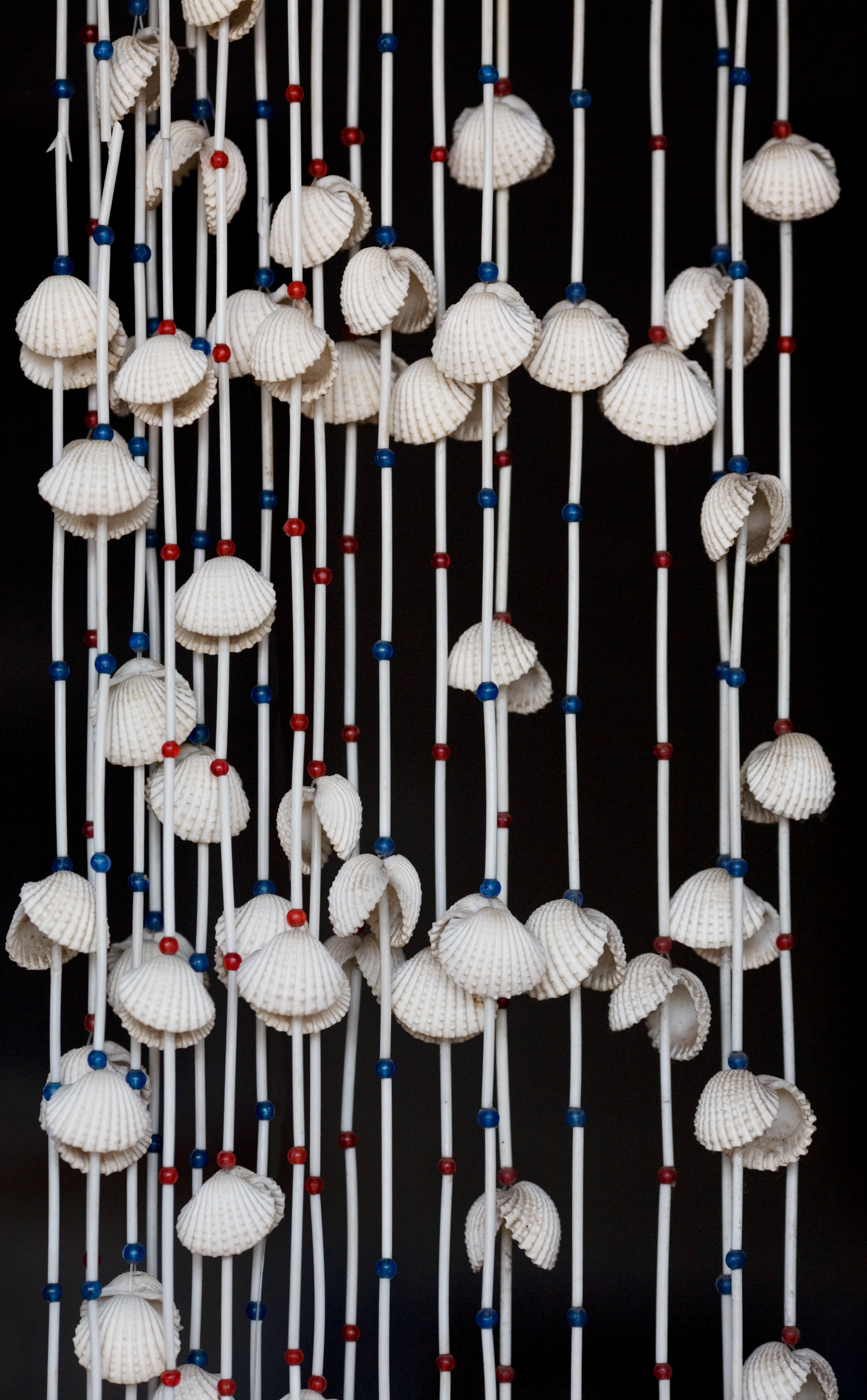
Seashell curtain

== See also ==
- Attic hatch
- Curtain ring, curtain rod, curtain tie-back
- Khus curtain
- Theatre drapes and stage curtains
- Front curtain
- Safety curtain
- Pipe and drape
- Kichō
