= Front curtain =

Stage curtain(s) at the very front of a theatrical stage

An Austrian curtain.

A front curtain, also known as a (front-of-)house curtain, act curtain, grand drape, main curtain or drape, proscenium curtain, or main rag is the stage curtain or curtains at the very front of a theatrical stage, separating it from the house.

The front curtain is usually opened at the beginning of a performance to reveal the stage set and closed for intermissions as well as the end of a performance. The most common material for the front curtain is a heavy velour material, often with pleated fullness sewn into the fabric to create a more opulent appearance.

== Types ==
There are several styles of house curtains, which vary in construction, operation, and cost. Depending on a curtain's type, its fabric may be flat or pleated, and it may drape, hang, or do both. Some types open with the full curtain rising out, either via a fly system or by gathering upwards with lines; other types part in the centre and either travel horizontally on a track or are pulled out diagonally using lines (See below). Some styles require a mechanical advantage like a winch to operate, while others are done by pulling an operating line or handling the drapes directly.

=== Austrian ===
The raising and lowering of an Austrian drape

The Austrian curtain or drape, also called a puff curtain, has multiple vertical lines (typically nylon) spaced evenly across the width of the fabric, which typically is a thin satin, charmeuse, or chiffon material that bunches well. Each line runs through a pulley at the top of the curtain and then horizontally to a common head block. The lines descend from the head block to a mechanical winch, which is used to raise the curtain. A winch is necessary to perform this function as the curtain would otherwise be too heavy for one person to raise.

As the winch turns, the curtain rises and is collected in a series of swags, which are accentuated by horizontal pleats (called festoons) sewn into the curtain from top to bottom, thereby giving it both vertical and horizontal fullness. Austrian curtains reached their height of popularity in the mid twentieth century. They are considered visually attractive and simple to operate and require little fly space, but have complicated rigging and are relatively expensive.

==== Venetian ====
The Venetian curtain, also known as a profile or contour curtain, also has multiple vertical lines distributed across the length of the single panel of fabric (which is usually made with as much as 200% fullness and must be thin and soft so it gathers well). The curtain is opened by pulling on the lines. Unlike the Austrian, each line is independently operated, making it possible to control the shape and height of curtain openings. This type of curtain is typically the most difficult type to operate because of the many independent lines.

==== Waterfall ====
A variation on the Venetian and Austrian is the waterfall curtain. Instead of horizontal festoons, the curtain has vertically running pleats like a traditional theater curtain, but it still gathers from the bottom in a number of swags. The waterfall has a pipe batten along the bottom edge to ensure the lines rise evenly. It is somewhat similar to a Roman shade, but with only one batten and vertical pleats.

=== Brail ===
A brail curtain or drape (Note: This is also frequently spelled "braille" and "braile" without discrimination, though "brail" is the most common spelling.) in its lowered position appears as a pleated panel much like a traveler curtain; it is rigged, however, as an Austrian curtain: The multiple lines leading through rings sewn to along the seams on the back side of the curtain cause the fabric to gather along the bottom in swags as the curtain is raised. It has a faster action than a traveler curtain, and like an Austrian it requires little fly space.

=== Olio drop ===
An olio curtain being raised and lowered

An olio drop (also spelled oleo (Note: The spelling of the word olio versus oleo is disputed and vague, and is interchangeable. They are both pronounced the same.)), also called olio curtain or roll drop, consists of a single large canvas called a drop, which is attached at the bottom to a long rigid tube rigged to roll as it rises out. The canvas is often decorated with a mural. Olio drops were popular in vaudeville theatre as they require a minimum of overhead space, were simple to construct, and in most cases could be operated by a single person.

Each end of the rigid tube of the drop has a single coil of rope called an "operating line" wrapped around it. One end of each operating line is secured to the fly space. The line descends from the fly space and loops around the tube once, then rises back up to the fly space and through a pulley. The other end of the line attaches to a counterbalance in the form of sandbags before running back down to the stage floor. When the two lines are pulled, the sandbags descend in unison, causing the tube to rotate and rise, thereby rolling up the canvas onto the tube and revealing the stage.

An olio requires a sturdy roll tube to prevent sagging. The larger the tube diameter, the more readily it will descend when the ropes are loosened.

=== Traveler ===
Travelers opening and closing

The most common type of front curtain is called a draw curtain, traveler curtain, bi-parting curtain, or just traveler. Traveler curtains remain at a fixed elevation and open and close horizontally, parting in the middle, and consequently require little overhead space. They always hang freely and therefore are seldom called "drapes." The curtains are typically made of velvet and decorated with a series of vertical box pleats along the top edge. They are the least costly kind of theater curtain to construct and are relatively simple to operate.

=== Tableau ===
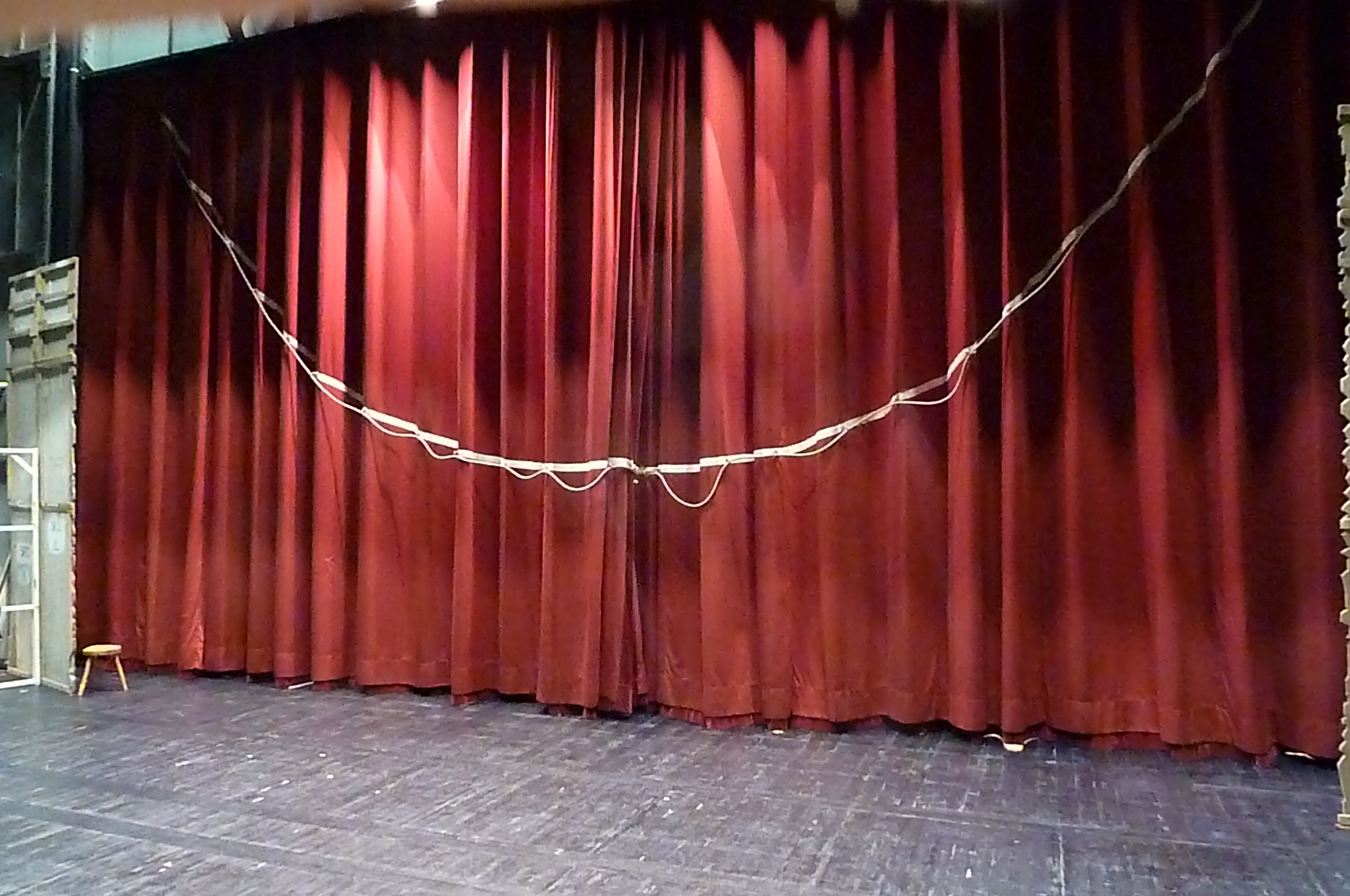
Back side of a tableau curtain - Grand théâtre d'Angers

The tableau, tab, or tabbed curtain, also called opera drapes, though iconic of the theater setting, is the rarest of curtains to actually be employed on the stage. It has two overlapping panels (often but not always pleated) immovably secured at the top, to a fixed batten. Each panel is sewn with a more-or-less diagonal series of rings, running from the upper offstage corner to the onstage-most side, either midway down or lower. A line or cable attaches to the lowest ring, runs diagonally offstage through the other rings, through a pulleys on the batten, then down to the floor. When the lines are pulled, each curtain is lifted diagonally offstagewards and out (upwards). In its open position it creates a frilled, tent-like viewing frame for the performance, like an inner proscenium arch: a top "scallop" with the rest of the curtain gathered at the sides (replacing the foremost fixed side curtains often used with other curtain types).

If the outer edges of the tab curtain don't overlap the edges of the fixed-wall proscenium arch, then the curtain will not fully clear the stage, and the tabs will tend to limit the audience's view. However, if there is no overlap, then tab curtains require no overhead space and no space in the wings. Thus it is rarely used except in very small venues. In either case, tab curtains do not need a track (as needed for a traveller) or sandbag counterweights (as needed for an oleo or an Austrian).

=== Wipe ===
A wipe curtain, named after the film editing technique called a wipe, is a single large curtain that is rigged in a manner similar to traveler curtains. Unlike travelers, which consist of two curtains that part at center stage, a wipe opens from the left or right side of the proscenium and travels horizontally across the entire stage.

== Curtain accents ==
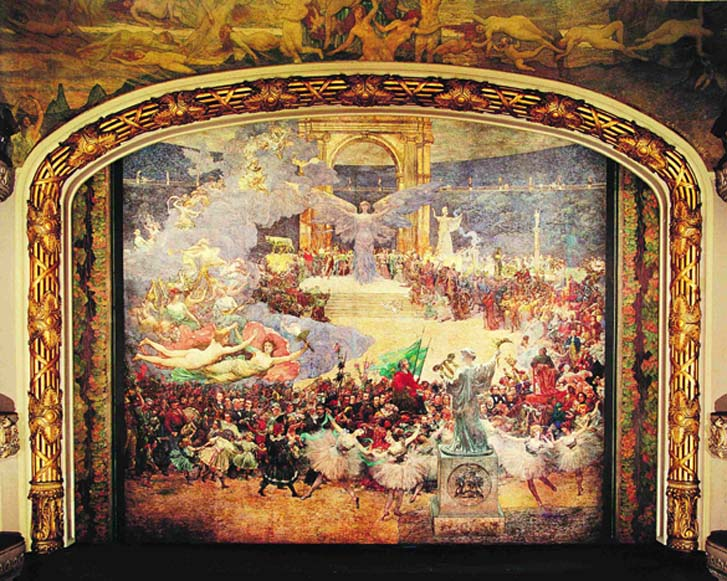
Theatro Municipal do Rio de Janeiro, painting by Eliseu Visconti (1908).

In some instances of both historical and modern theatres and opera houses, pictures or murals have been printed onto the front curtain, typically to accentuate or complement the architecture or stylistic theme of the theatre. Graphics projected with gobos may create a similar effect, or depict images relevant to the production. Stage lighting instruments may project coloured washes onto the front curtain. These washes help accentuate the front curtain. The instruments that project the wash are known as "curtain warmers."

== See also ==
- Fire curtain
- Theater drapes and stage curtains
