= Jabot (window) =

Illustration of a set of jabots around a window Swags are shown in brown, jabots in red and yellow, curtains in red only

A jabot /ʒæˈboʊ/, also called cascade or tail, is a vertically pleated piece of window treatment used with festoons or swags along the top of a window on the inside of a building. The usual purpose of a jabot is to hide the seams between individual swags, though for treatments with only one swag, their purpose is simply decorative (unlike most curtains, jabots do not serve to block the passage of light). Visually, they represent a continuation of the swag over the ends of a pole, and are always made of the same decorator fabric on the facing side as the swag itself. Jabots are often lined, however, with a different style or color of fabric, which is then revealed along the bottom edge with each pleat.

== See also ==
- Jabot (neckwear)
