= Sidelight =

Type of window

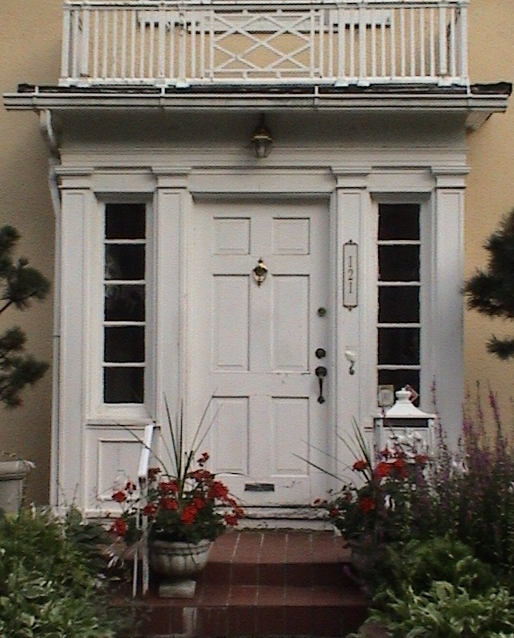
Door with sidelights

A sidelight or sidelite in a building is a window, usually with a vertical emphasis, that flanks a door or a larger window. Sidelights are narrow, usually stationary and found immediately adjacent to doorways. While most commonly found as supporting elements emphasizing the importance of a primary entrance, sidelights may be employed at any interior or exterior door where a visual emphasis is desired, or where additional light or visibility is needed.

== Design ==
Sidelights are often found in tandem with transom windows and generally the pane size in the sidelights matches that of the transom. Typically narrow, sidelights can be placed on both or just one side of a door and can include a sash or have glass that is stopped into the frame.

== Security and privacy concerns ==
While transom windows generally do not have any privacy concerns associated with them because of their height, sidelights usually need to be covered to ensure privacy. Any number of window treatments can be employed to enhance privacy in doorways with sidelights. Miniblinds, micro-miniblinds, and shirred curtains are among the window treatments that offer an increased level of privacy. Another choice is stained or beveled glass, which can offer some privacy while also contributing to the overall beauty of a building's design.

When approaching building security sidelights can factor into entrance security. For instance, for proper security a sidelight should only be installed on the side of the door without the door knob or handle. Sidelights provide people on a building's interior with a narrow view of the outdoors and as such doors without sidelights, especially in apartment buildings, should be equipped with a peephole.
