= Window blind =

Type of window covering

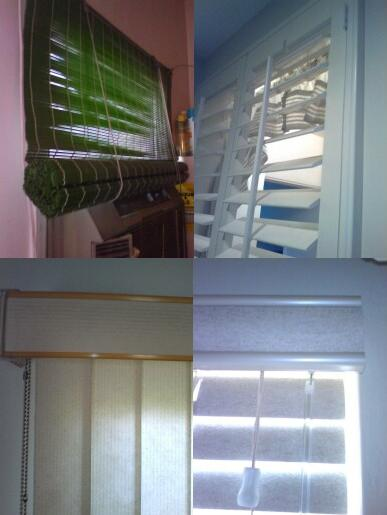
Various window blind styles

A window blind is a type of window covering (also known as blinds). There are many different kinds of window blinds which use a variety of control systems. A typical window blind is made up of several long horizontal or vertical slats of various types of hard material, including wood, plastic or metal which are held together by cords that run through the blind slats. Vertical blinds run along a track system which can tilt open and closed and move side-to-side. Window blinds can be manoeuvred with either a manual or remote control by rotating them from an open position, with slats spaced out, to a closed position where slats overlap and block out most of the light. There are also several types of window coverings, called shades, that use a single piece of soft material instead of slats.

The term window blinds can also be used to describe window coverings more broadly. In this context window blinds include almost every type of window covering, whether it is a hard or soft material; i.e. shutters, roller shades, cellular shades (also called honeycomb shades), wood blinds, Roman shades, standard vertical, and horizontal blinds (also called Venetians). In the United Kingdom, awnings are sometimes called blinds or shades.

== Overview ==
Windows and doors make up for almost one-third of a home's total thermal loss, according to the Department of Energy (United Kingdom). This applies to heat loss in winter as well as entry of undesired heat in summer. When air inside the room comes in contact with windows, it is cooled or warmed. By convection, this air then circulates around the room. Window blinds can reduce solar gain in summer and provide room darkening or blackout for sleeping.

Window blinds come in a variety of different styles, materials, colours, patterns, and dimensions. Below is a list of several popular styles of blinds:

- Panel
- Pleated
- Roller
- Roman
- Venetian
- Vertical
- Wooden

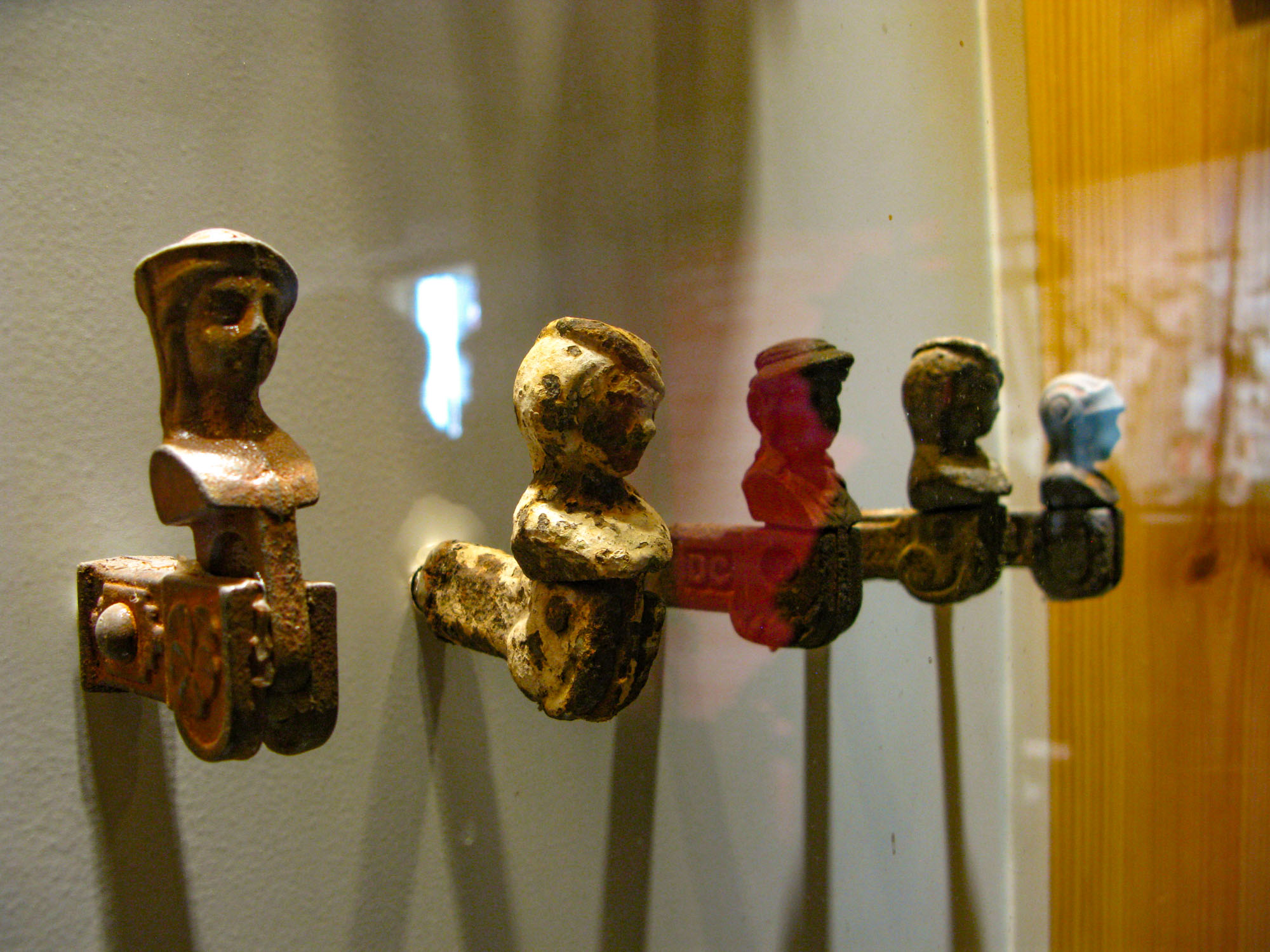
Window blind stoppers (menchalakh) to prevent open window blinds from closing. From the Sarona Museum in Israel

Window blinds can be drawn manually using a cord, or automated through motorization. Controls for motorized blinds can be from a wall switch or keypad, remote control, or computer, eliminating the need for cords and allowing control of otherwise inaccessible windows. Cordless blinds also reduce the risk of strangulation for small children.

A number of modern homes are integrating blind control with central C-Bus solutions. This control provides ease of use and is effective for controlling blind operation to reduce heat loss during winter or minimize heat from the sun during summer.

Window blinds are generally sold as either ready-made or made to measure. As the names suggest, blinds that are ready-made are manufactured to set sizes based on typical window dimensions, whereas blinds that are made to a measurement are cut to a specific width and drop to match the window. The advantage of ready-made blinds is their availability and cost, whereas blinds that are made to measure will be more expensive but better fit the dimensions of a window.

== Types ==
=== Panel ===
Panel blinds, sometimes referred to as Japanese blinds as they are based on Japanese shōji, are thin blinds in a panel shape that run along a track. Almost any fabric or paper can be employed, although 90% of all shoji blinds use white polyester to imitate 'washi' Japanese paper.

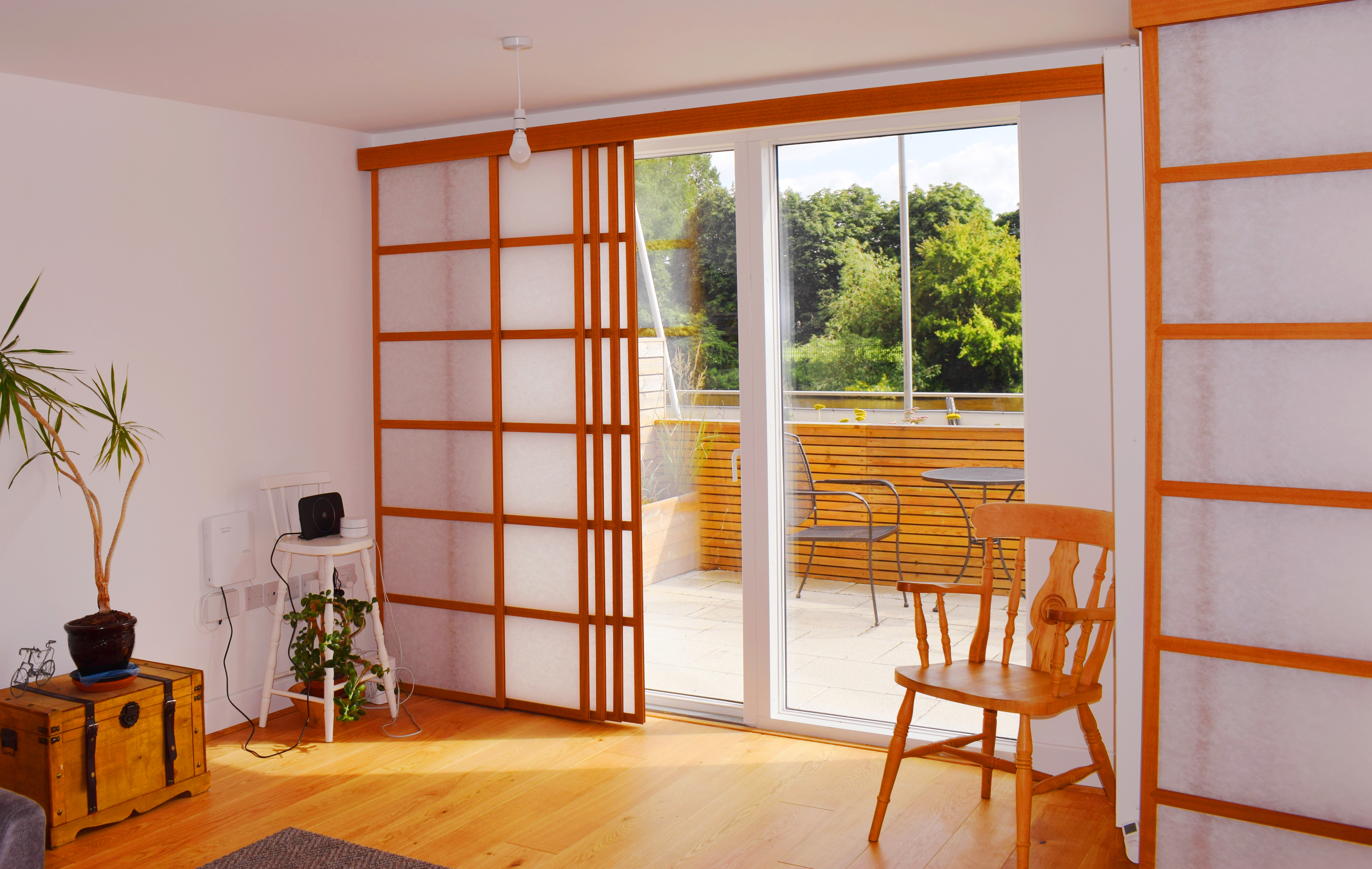
Japanese shoji blinds in Nottingham, UK

=== Cellular shades ===
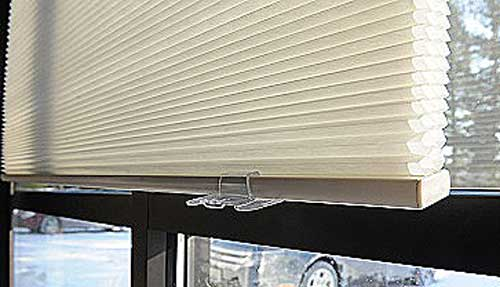
Cellular shades, also called honeycomb shades, hanging in a window

Cellular shades or cellular blinds, sometimes referred to as honeycomb shades, are a type of window blind made of a long and continuous fabric with a cellular structure when opened and fold onto themselves when closed. The honeycomb shades were introduced in 1985. The fabric is often made from soft paper or cloth-like material and is available in a variety of different structures including single cell, double cell or triple cell. Cellular blinds lessen the transfer of heat through windows by trapping air inside the cell structure once opened, creating a barrier between the window surface and the room. Due to the unavailability of standardized tests, no ranking system currently exists to compare the efficacy of these blinds.

In common with all blinds, cellular shades can reduce solar gain and provide room darkening. However, they provide only slight control of air infiltration from outside.

Like most other window treatments, cellular shades are raised and lowered with a string. However, cordless varieties are available, which reduce the risk of strangulation for small children. Varieties also exist with the option of lowering the top of the shade down, and/or the bottom of the shade up; this is commonly referred to as a Top-Down-Bottom-Up mechanism.

=== Roman ===
Roman shades are a type of window blind used to help block out the sun. Although often called blinds, these are actually referred to as "shades" in the window covering industry. They are often referred to as Romans or Roman blinds in the UK. When opened, the Romans stack up evenly; when covering the full window height, they are smooth without overlapping.

Roman blinds can be purchased with a blackout lining on the back to fully block out sunlight. However, there will always be small light gaps on the edges of the blinds if mounted on the inside of the window frame or peeking out from behind the blind if mounted on the frame around the window.

Unlike other blinds, such as certain fabrics used for roller shades, vinyl vertical blinds, or vinyl horizontal blinds, Roman shades are not an ideal option for areas with a lot of moisture, such as bathrooms or windows above a kitchen sink.

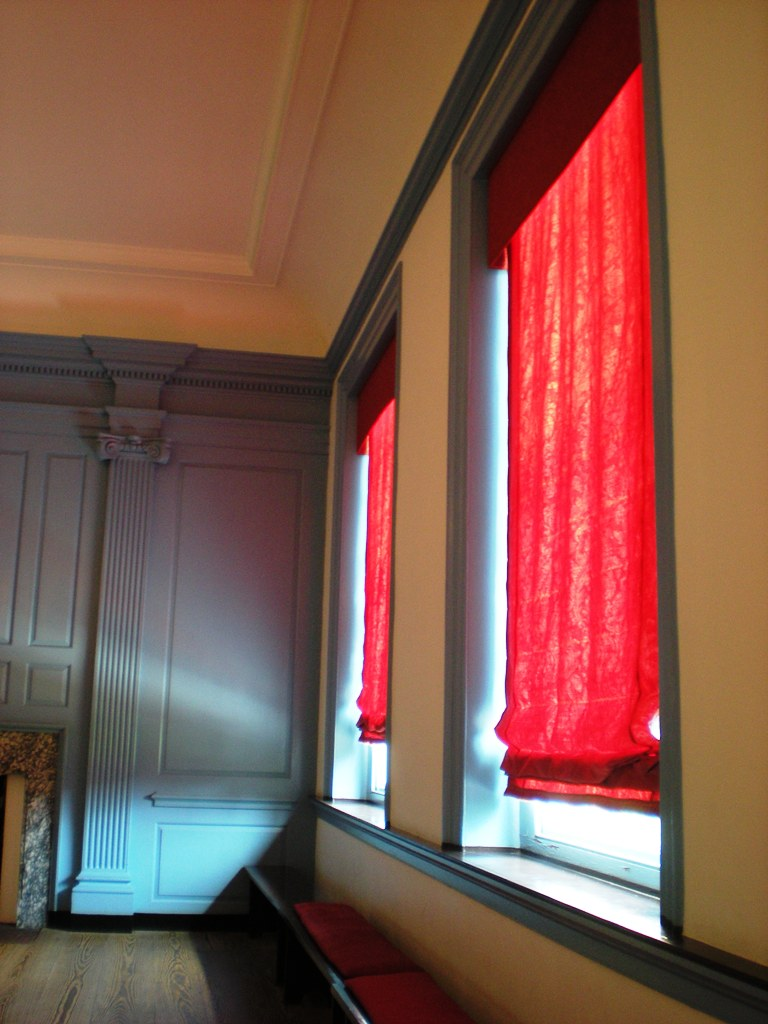
Independence Hall

=== Roller ===
Roller blinds are a type of window blind that is typically made from a polyester fabric wrapped around a plastic or metal roller. The roller may either be exposed or enclosed inside of a frame and can be placed at the top of the window recess or outside of the recess. To control the roller blind there is typically a chain or string on either side of the blind. When the side chain is pulled one direction the roller will raise, and if pulled in the opposite direction it will lower instead.

Roller blind fabrics vary in optical properties including openness factor and visible transmittance. These characteristics influence daylight transmission, the clarity of the outward view and glare. Research evaluating roller blind fabrics has therefore considered daylight, glare and exterior view together when assessing their visual performance.

Some manufacturers also produce a version of roller blinds with two layers of fabric, sometimes referred to as double roller blinds, for even greater control of light filtration through a window. Typically, one layer will be made of a sheer fabric that can be used to reduce glare, with a second layer that typically includes a blackout lining for even greater filtration when necessary.

=== Venetian ===
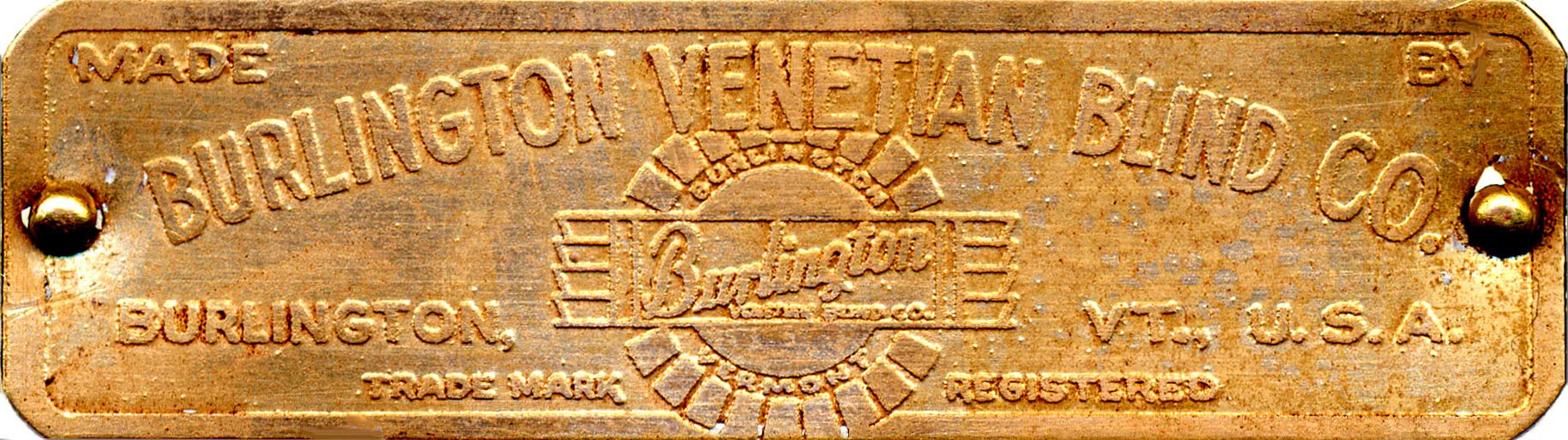
Venetian Blind Co. brass tag

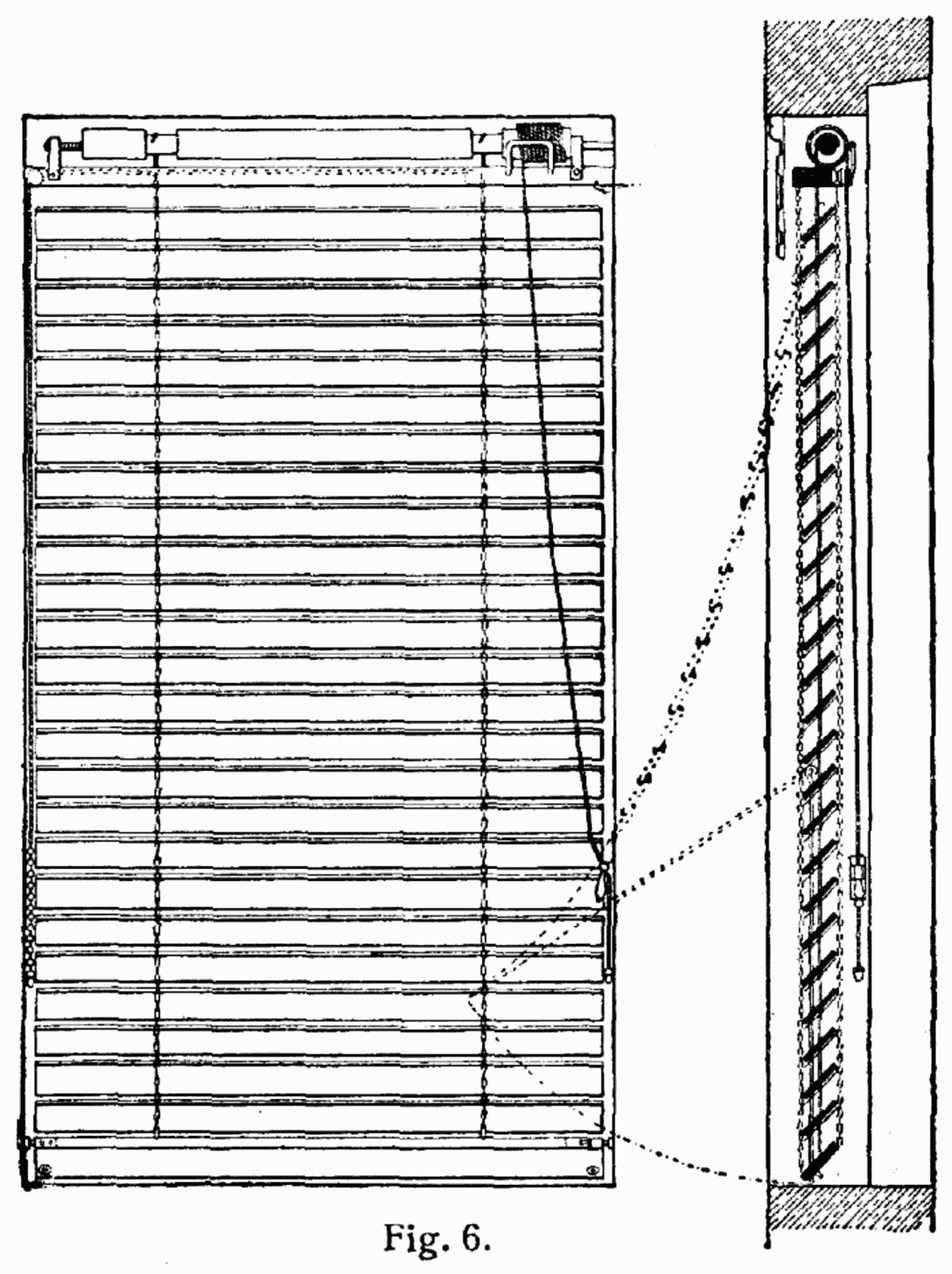
Venetian blinds diagram

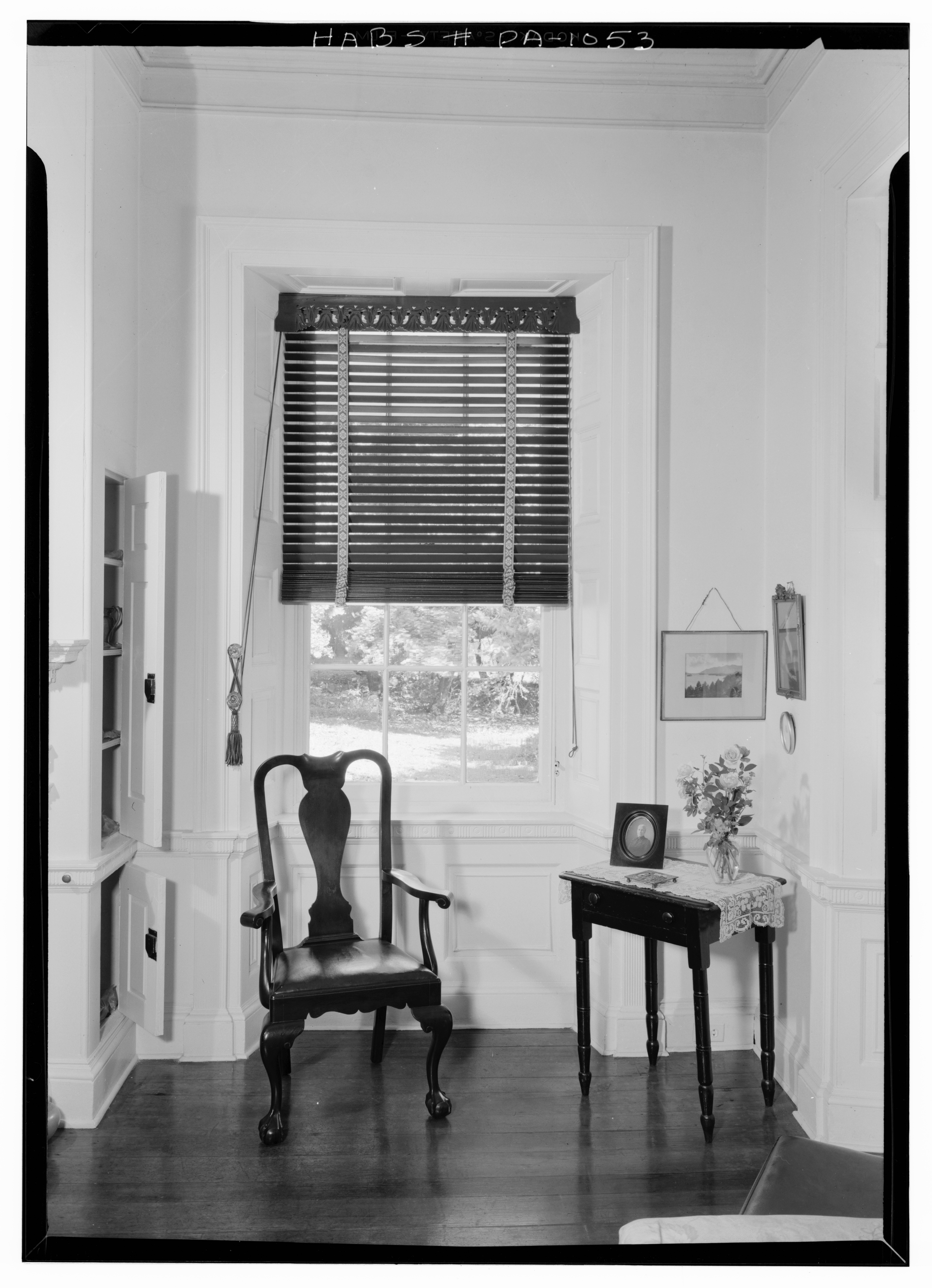
Venetian blinds on window

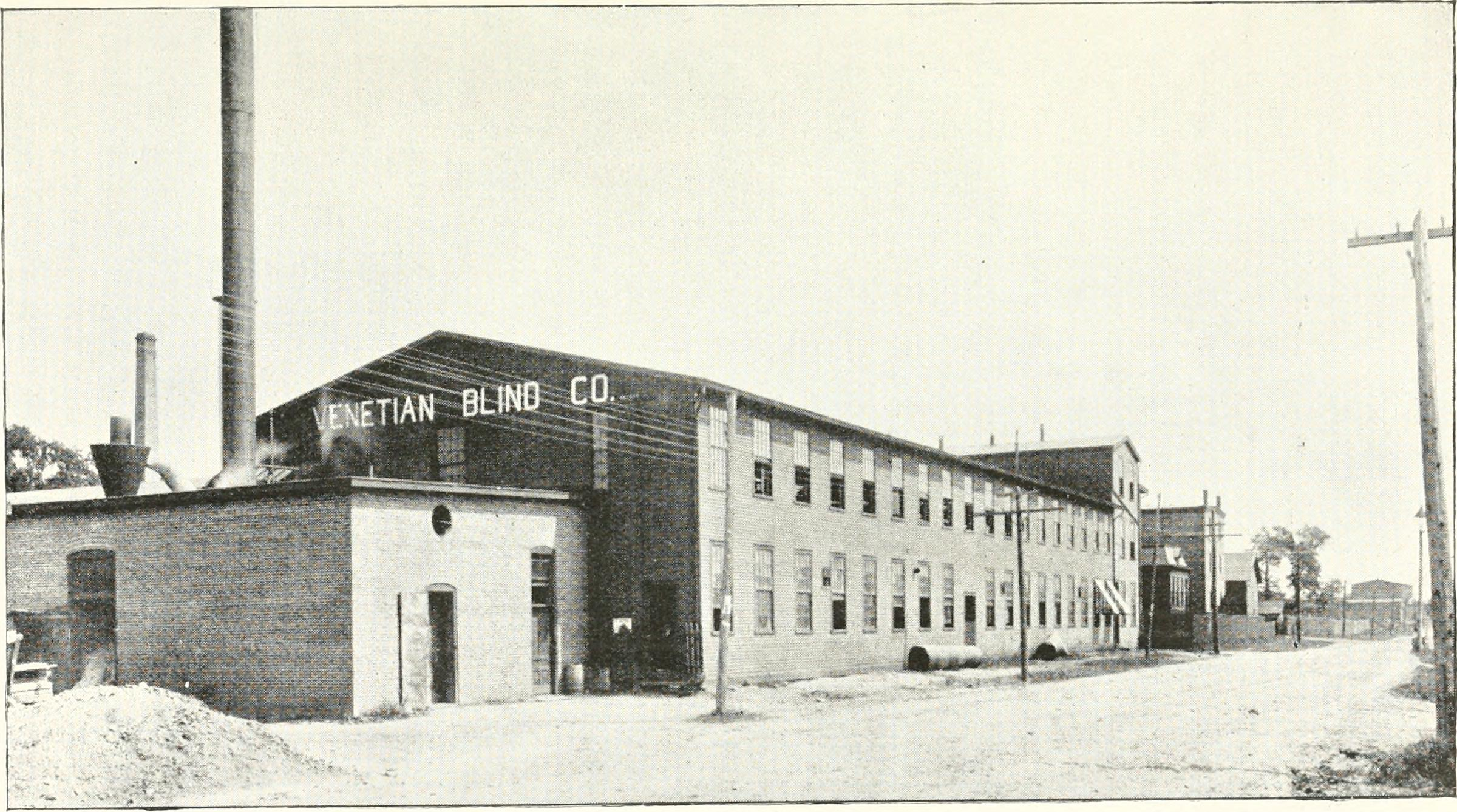
Venetian Blind Co.

A Venetian blind is a type of window blind made from overlapping horizontal slats that are typically lowered and drawn together by pulling a cord. The slats are typically manufactured using a rigid material such as aluminium, plastic, or wood and move in unison through a series of wires that run through the blinds.

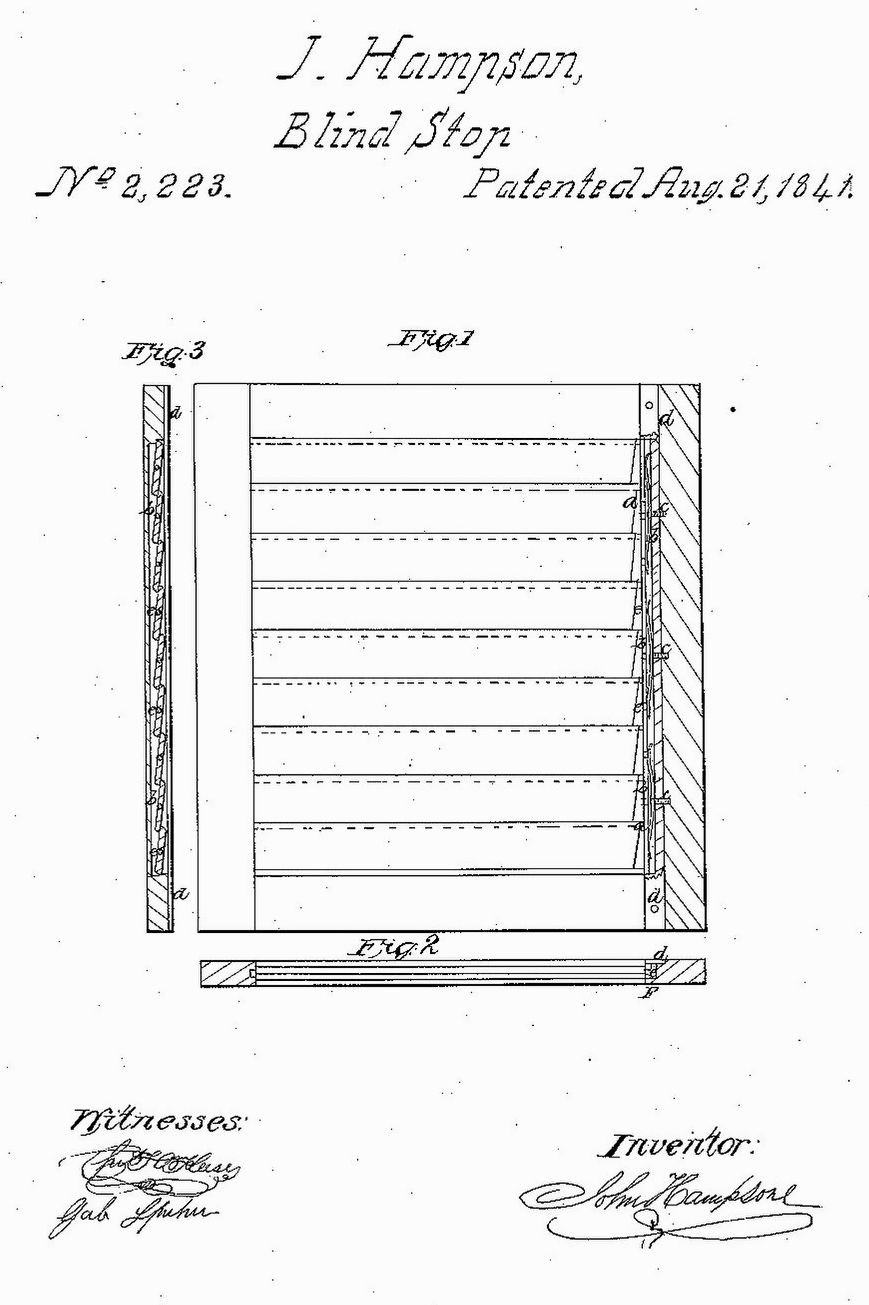
Patent of 1841 for modern style blinds able to be held at angles and adjustable by cords

In the late 19th and early 20th centuries, Venetian blinds were widely adopted in office buildings to regulate light and air. A large modern complex in the US that adopted Venetian blinds was Rockefeller Center's RCA Building (better known as the Radio City building) in New York City, completed in the 1930s. One of the largest orders for Venetian blinds ever placed was to the Burlington Venetian Blind Co., of Burlington, Vermont, which supplied blinds for the windows of the Empire State Building in New York City. In 1994, a design for Venetian blinds integrated with window glass panels was patented. This new type of blind overcomes the problems related to damaging and fouling. Usually, magnets are used for motor transmission in order to preserve the sealing inside the insulating glass.

=== Vertical ===
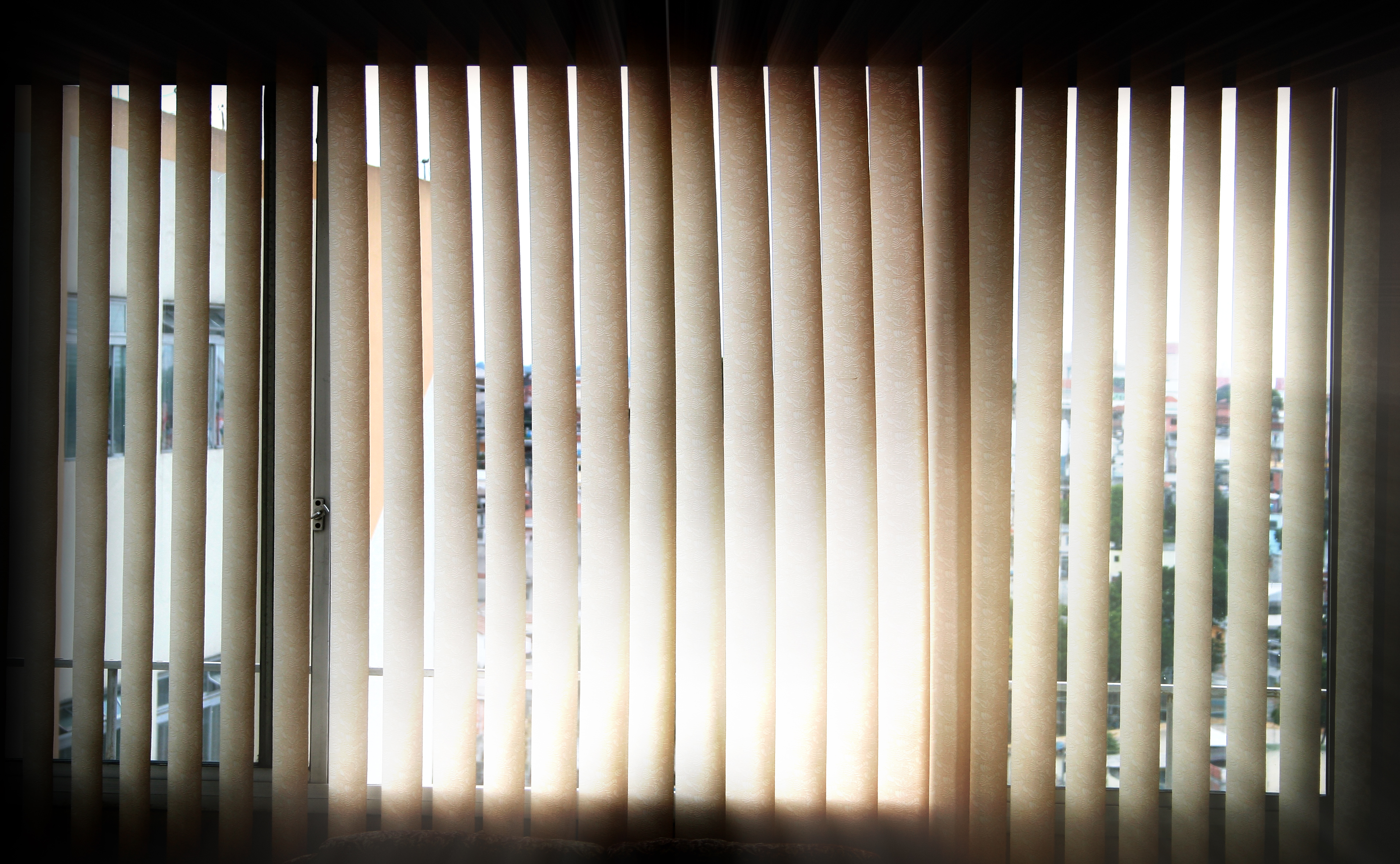
Vertical blinds, vanes are rotated to semi-closed position

Vertical blinds were introduced in 1948 (Flexible Blind Company, Hunter Douglas), and gained acceptance as an alternative to draperies due to the streamlined look, versatility, energy efficiency, large variety of finishes. The construction includes a horizontal (occasionally, in custom designs, tilted) track with moving carriers and vertical strips, called vanes, hanging off the carriers (attached by clips). The vanes can rotate, changing the amount of light entering the room, and, when in open position, traverse the track (and thus be stacked compactly on one side of the window). When closed, the vanes tightly overlap, creating a good barrier against the sunlight penetration in summer and energy loss in winter.

Unlike horizontal blinds, vertical blinds are less likely to collect dust because they stand vertically. Since they draw to the side rather than lifting and lowering, they are easier and faster to operate. They operate best on patio doors and sliding windows that slide from side to side. In the 1970s there were few choices of fabric- usually beige or white, which had to have stiffener embedded to prevent fraying, rather like on roller blinds fabric but using a thicker textile.

Vertical blinds became available in flat plastic (PVC), fabric, embossed PVC, also S-curved slats. A more modern modification is to offer them with wood trim at the top and bottom—sometimes midway as well—and these are usually described as "Japanese Vertical blinds" because they are often coordinated with Japanese style Shoji blinds using the same timber. Vertical blinds were most popular in the UK during the 1990s, since then sales have slowed as they lost popularity with a younger generation.

Stationary vertical blinds are hung in the doorways of some homes and businesses which generally leave the door open. Movement of the blind may signal a change in airflow, or someone entering the doorway. More commonly, however, these vertical blinds are made of thick plastic. In the cold rooms of food businesses, this slows the heat leakage into the cold room. In warmer climates, vertical blinds discourage flies and some other insects from entering the building. In certain areas of the UK window blinds are used to disguise the fact that offices have PCs in them and are used as a burglary deterrent.

=== Others ===
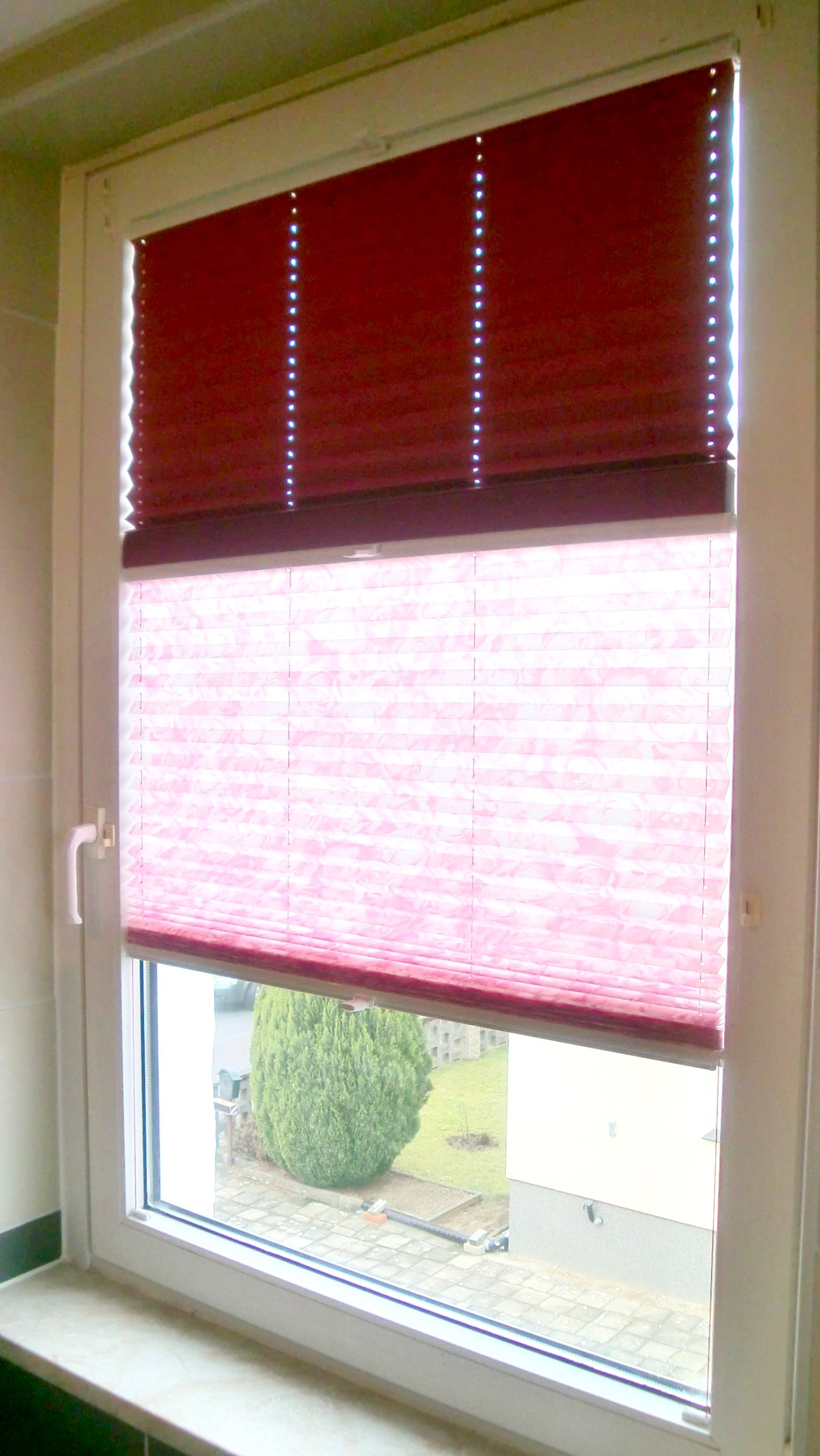
Pleated blind

Other varieties of window blinds include mini blinds (typically aluminum, Venetian-Style blinds with very narrow slats, usually 25 mm or 1 inch wide), micro blinds (usually 13 mm or 1/2 inch wide), louvers, jalousies, brise soleil and pleated blinds.

Roller shutters can also be used as window blinds.

== Materials ==
Blinds can be made in a variety of materials; some expensive and some less so. Less expensive blinds are usually made in polyester, aluminum, or PVC. These are inexpensive materials that are all easily accessible and yet durable at the same time.

A window blind is a means of screening a window, achieving similar results to those obtained by fitting curtains. Blinds are typically the same width and height as the window itself or slightly wider and taller—depending on whether they are fixed inside (Recess) or outside (Facefix) the window's reveal (i.e. the wall recess within which the window itself is fixed).

Window blinds have varying thermal effects: they can block unwanted heat of the summer sun and they can keep in heat in cold weather. But in both of these applications, they also reduce light to varying degrees, depending on the design. Many kinds of blinds attempt varying balances of privacy and shade. Blinds can be made of a number of different materials and manufactured in a number of different ways. This usually determines the name by which the blind is commonly known.

=== Fabric ===
Blinds (otherwise referred to as "shades") made of fabric can either be rolled up (on a tube; Roller shades), folded up (Roman shades) or pushed up in an accordion style (Pleated and Cellular shades). Many fabrics are used including cotton, polyester, wool, viscose and silk to create these shades. A silk cloth can be present or embroidery stitch, which will give tissue varied terrain.

=== Wood ===
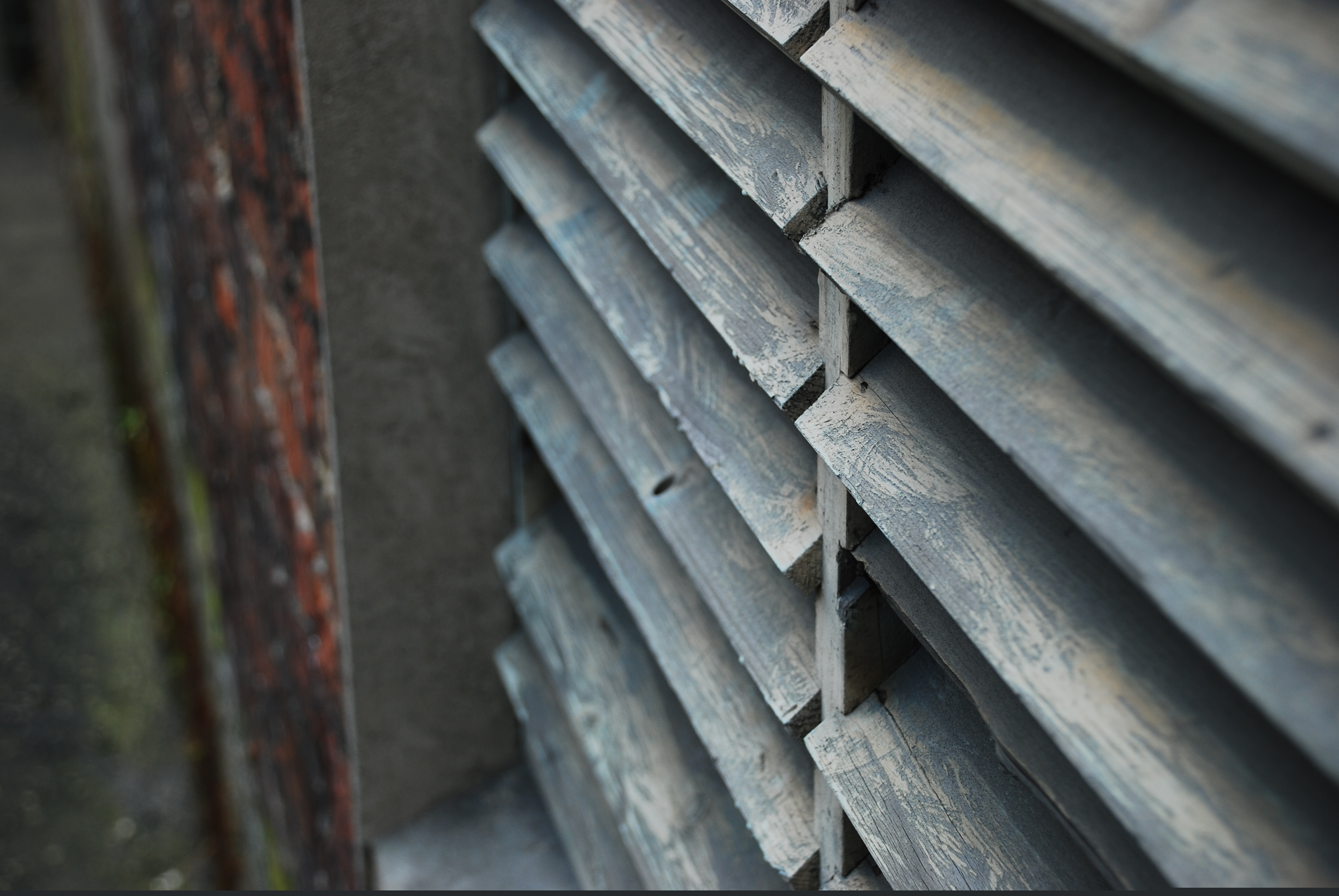
Wood blinds on an outside window

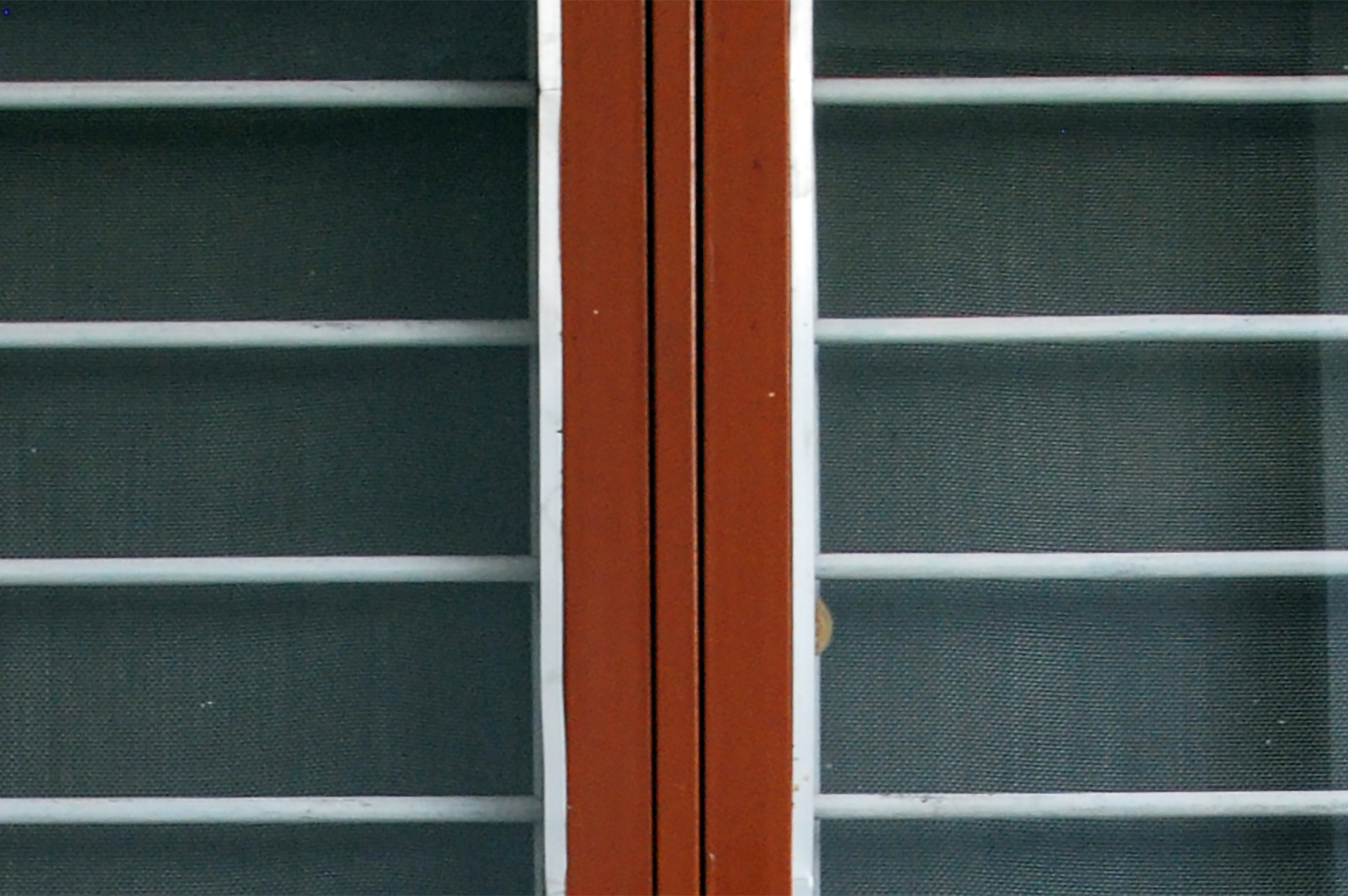
Net blind on a wooden window, Bengaluru, India

==== Wooden blinds (Venetian blinds) ====
Wooden blinds are generally known as Venetian blinds. A number of horizontal wooden slats are joined by corded pulleys which can either gather all the slats at the top of the window to reveal the view or simply angle the slats while allowing some light to travel through the blind yet retaining some level of privacy. Wooden blinds come in a number of finishes (determined by the type of wood used, which ranges from painted to most types of solid oak varieties) and sizes (determined by the width of each slat which is usually available in one of three widths—25 mm [1 in], 35 mm [1 1/2 in], or 50 mm [2 in]). Wooden Venetian blinds are also available as vertical blinds. These are usually made up of wider slats and operate in virtually the same way as their horizontal counterparts (i.e. instead of drawing upwards to reveal the window, they draw to one side gathering in a vertical bunch).

==== Pinoleum blinds ====
Pinoleum blinds are made up of small wooden twigs laid horizontally which are joined by vertical threading. The resulting weave is, as a result, only flexible vertically and can be drawn upwards once manufactured as a roller blind or in a similar fashion to a Venetian blind. Conservatory blinds are often made with Pinoleum.

In Malaysia, an outdoor blind is sometimes called a "chik". The word was carried over from India by the British during the colonial times.

=== Faux wood ===
Faux wood blinds are an alternative to real wood blinds. Faux wood is also known by the trade name Plaswood (a portmanteau of plastic & wood). Made of a composite of man-made materials and natural wood particles, faux wood can be a less expensive choice than natural wood. These blinds have become more popular as the products have matured, becoming cheaper and more versatile at the same time offering more of a natural wood look. Current [when?] faux wood blinds are sometimes warp resistant, may have UV ratings as high as 500 and come in colors that would be hard to find in natural wood blinds. Because of their resistance to warping, faux wood window blinds are suitable for areas with extreme temperature swings or high moisture, such as bathrooms and kitchens.

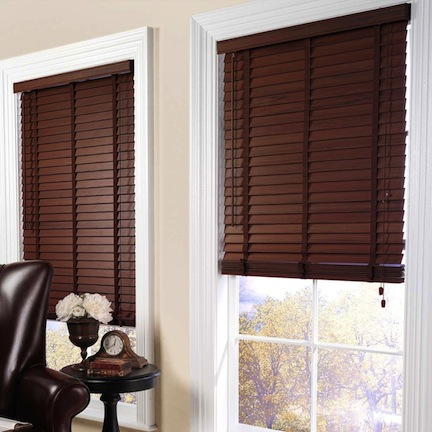
Faux wood blinds in use

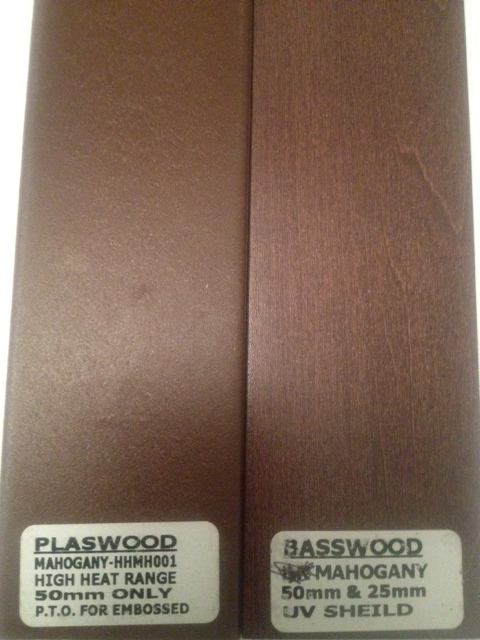
Basswood compared to faux wood

=== Other materials ===
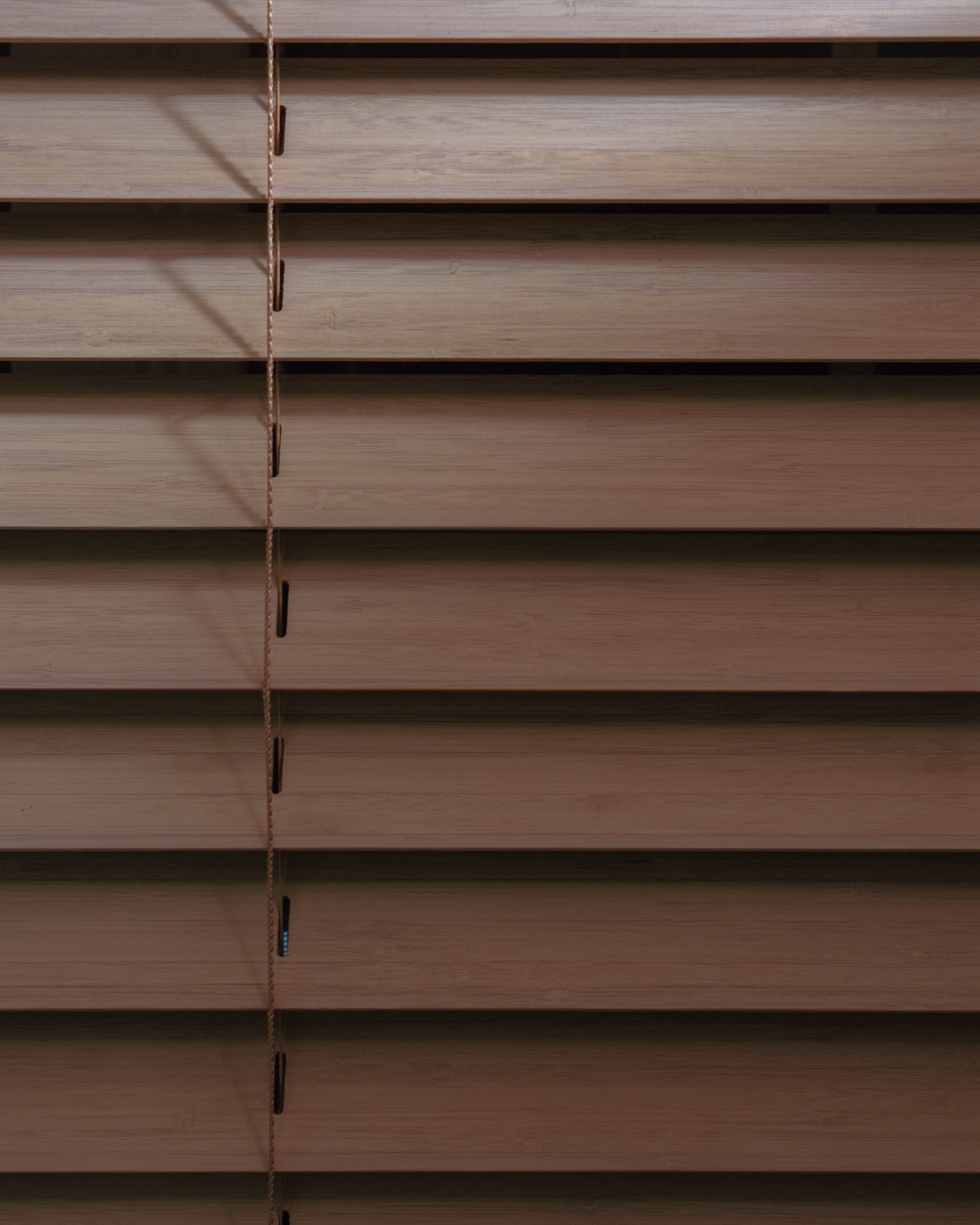
Composite lumber window blind

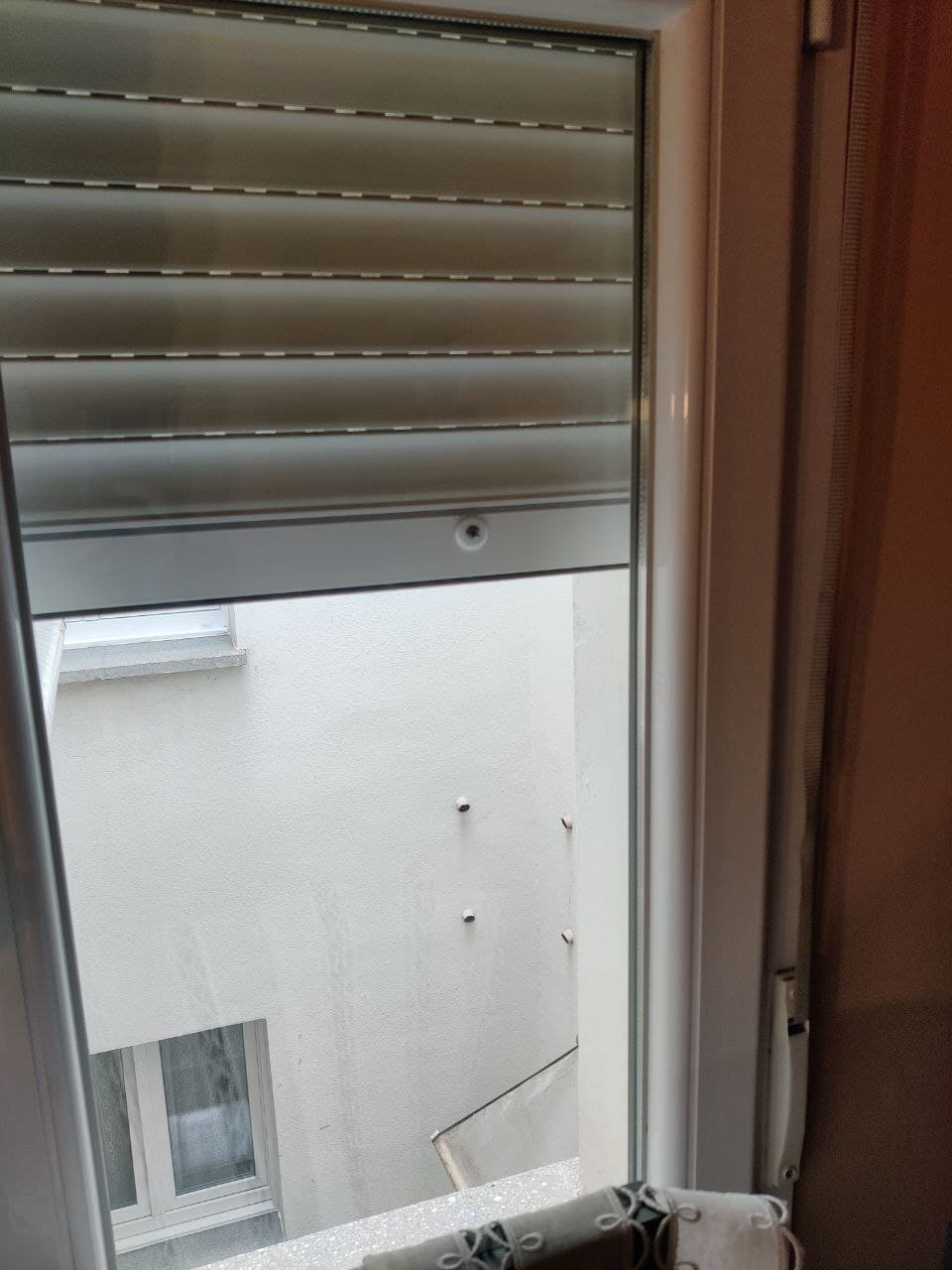
Rollable outside window blind

Venetian blinds, both horizontal and vertical, are available in a number of man-made materials (either resembling wood or metal or simply plastic). These are better suited to areas where moisture or direct contact with water is likely to cause a problem, such as bathrooms and kitchens. These blinds are often available with micro slats (as small as 16 mm or 5/8 in or less). The result of smaller slats is that more have to be used to obscure the window completely. Conservatory blinds (i.e. ceiling fixed via a number of horizontal pulleys) are often made of man-made materials.

== Safety ==
Corded window blinds present a strangulation hazard to children, causing 184 deaths in the United States between 1996 and 2012. Recalls of window covering products have not significantly reduced the number of deaths since 1980. Retrofit kits have been used since 1995 to "reduce" the strangulation hazard; however, children have strangled on retrofit kits since 1995. The US CPSC recommends using cordless or cord-free window coverings where children live or visit. For window coverings that use continuous-loop cord systems, like vertical blinds, a wall cord cleat can be used to anchor the cord tightly to the wall and prevent children from having access to the dangling cord loop. Window blinds slats are held together with cords that allow for tilting slats, raising or lowering, and these are potentially dangerous if loose. As an added precaution, cord stops should be installed correctly and adjusted to restrict the movement of inner lift cords.

== Vehicle blinds ==
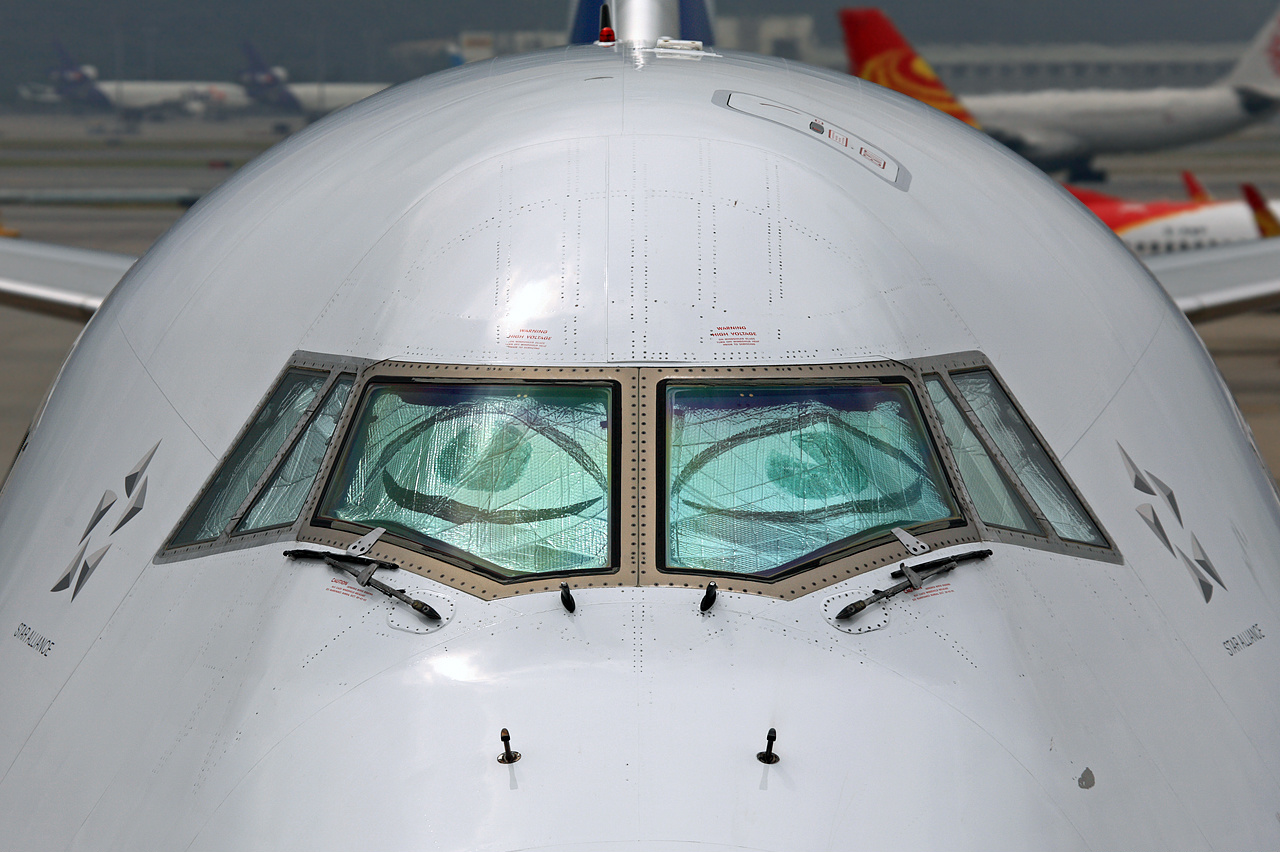
Shades on a United Airlines Boeing 747-400

Some vehicles include or are retrofitted with sun blinds for rear windows. See also car glass. These blinds are used to protect the vehicle and the passengers from direct sunlight.

Car shades are another common way to protect the vehicle. The shades for the rear and front windows are designed to be unfolded and sit against the window.

Most commercial airliners feature blackout window blinds in the passenger cabin. These blinds are generally made of plastic and are usually closed during cruises. In a first for the aviation industry, the Boeing 787 Dreamliner lacks window blinds – instead, the airliner features an advanced window dimming system that serves the same purpose.

== Gallery ==
Examples

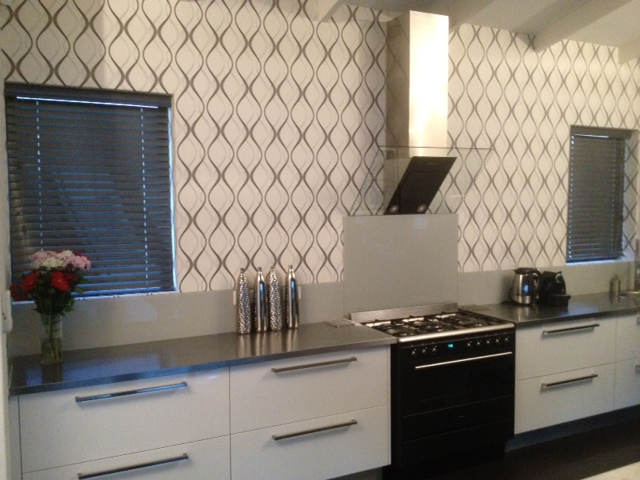
Roller blinds installed in a kitchen

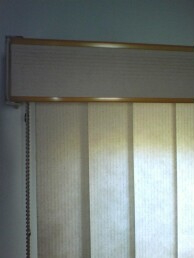
Close-up of a track blind, also known as vertical drapes

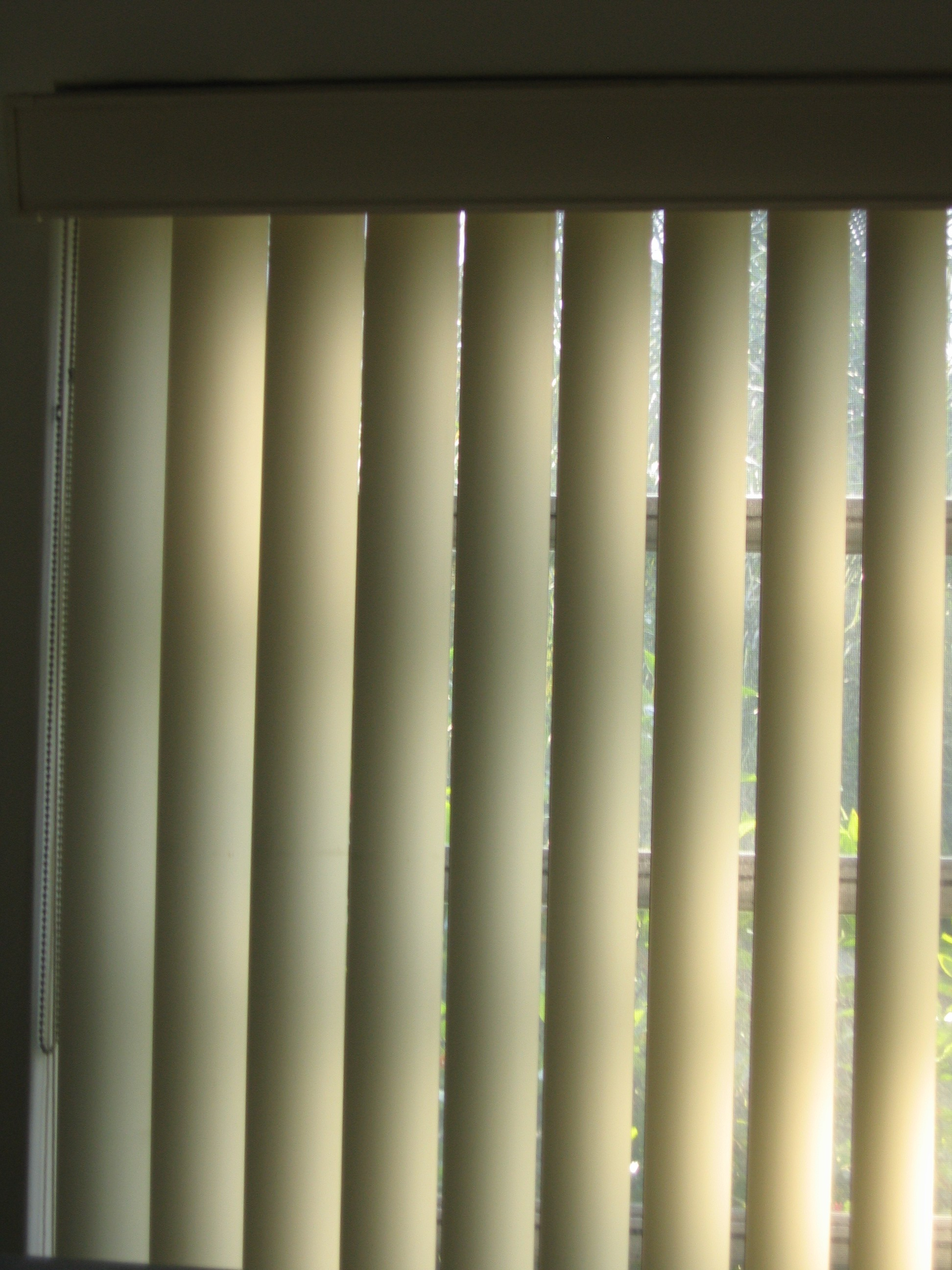
Track blind

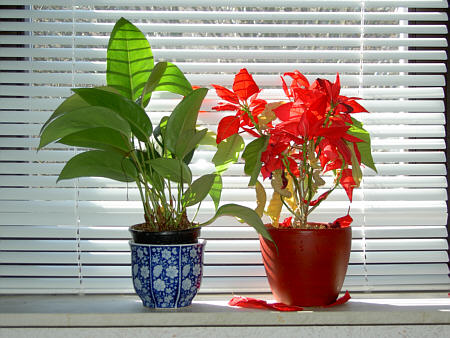
Blind with horizontal slats also, known as Venetian blind

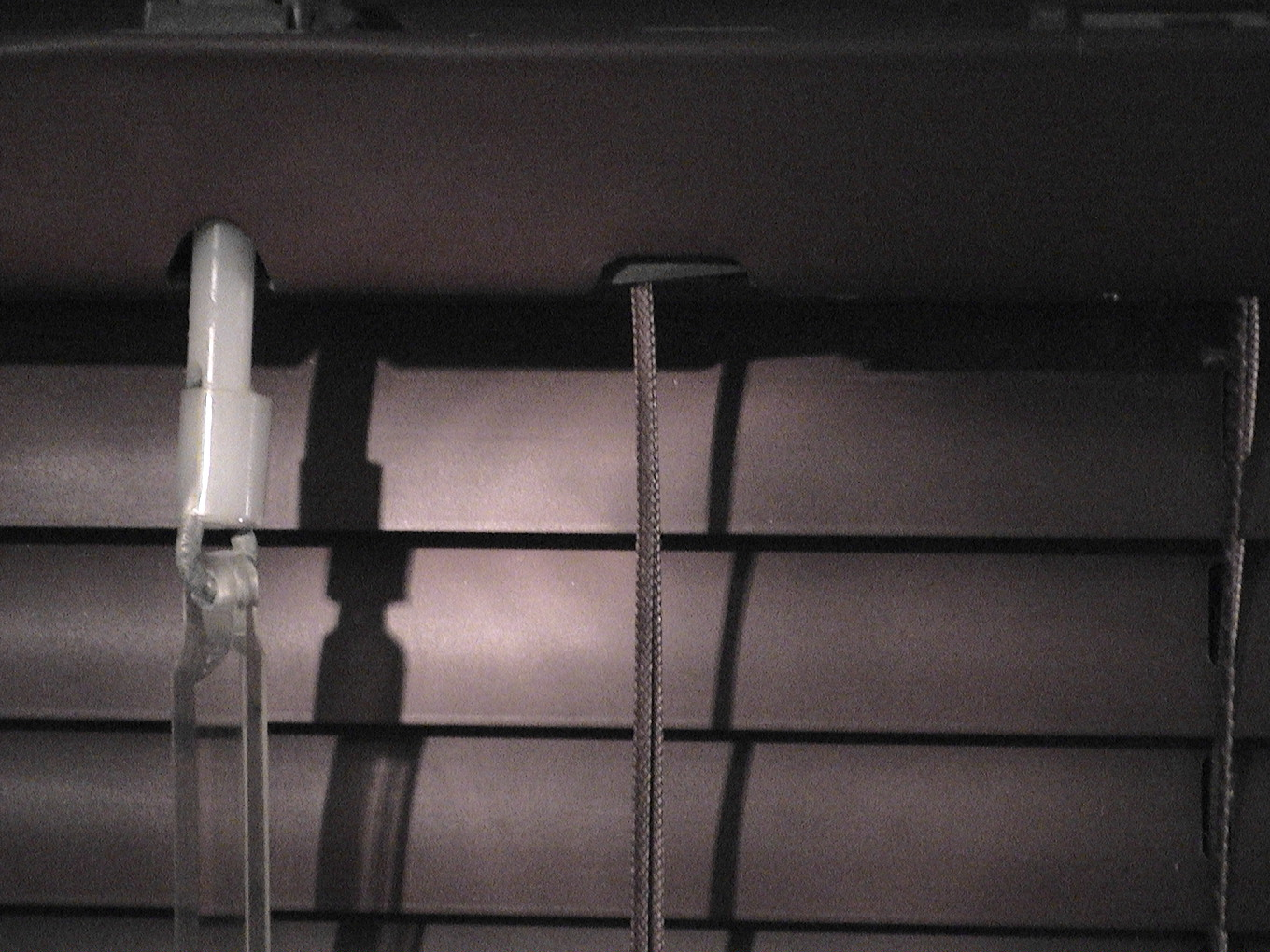
Detail of turning rod (blind stick) attachment on miniblind

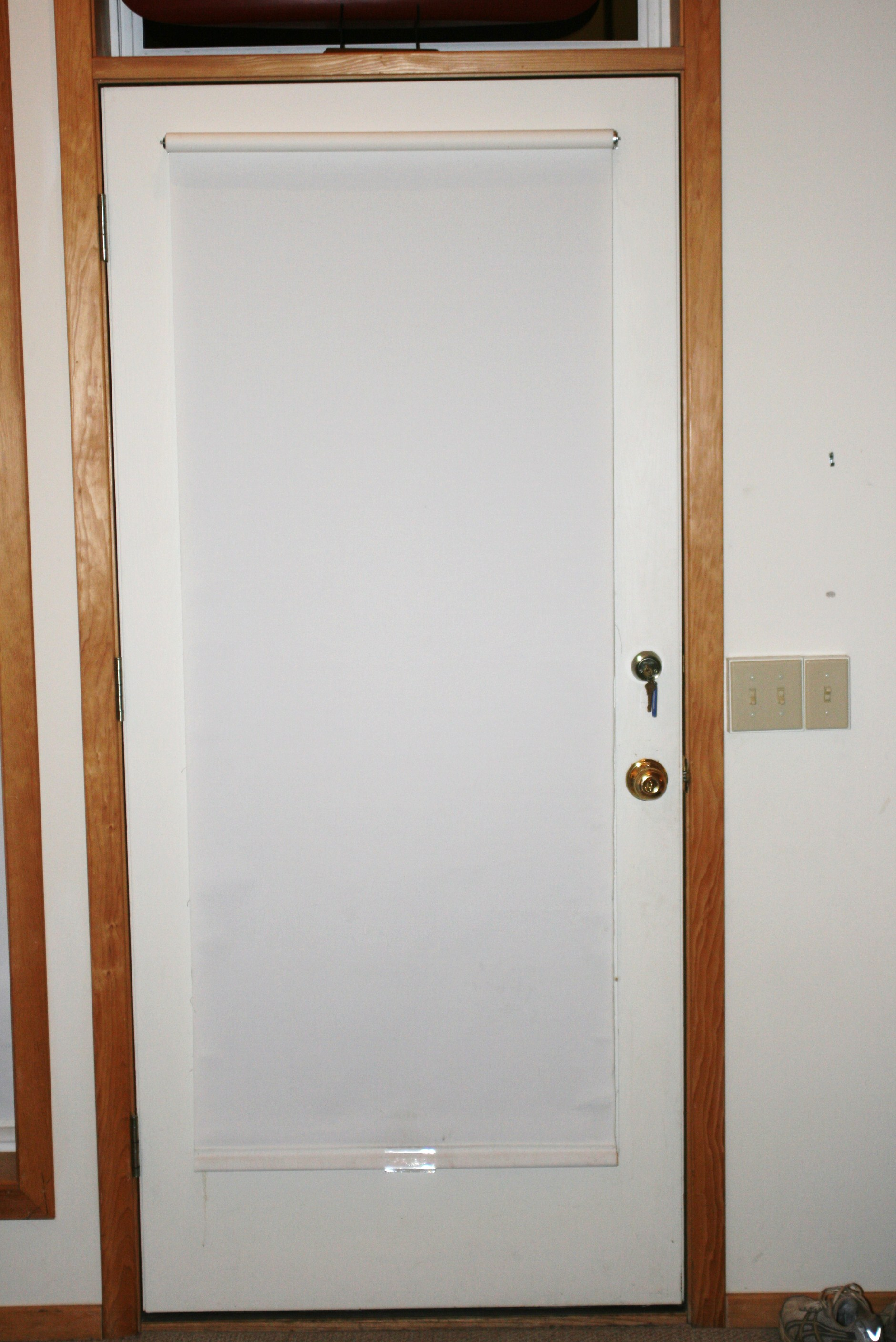
A roller blind on a door as a perfect fit roller blind

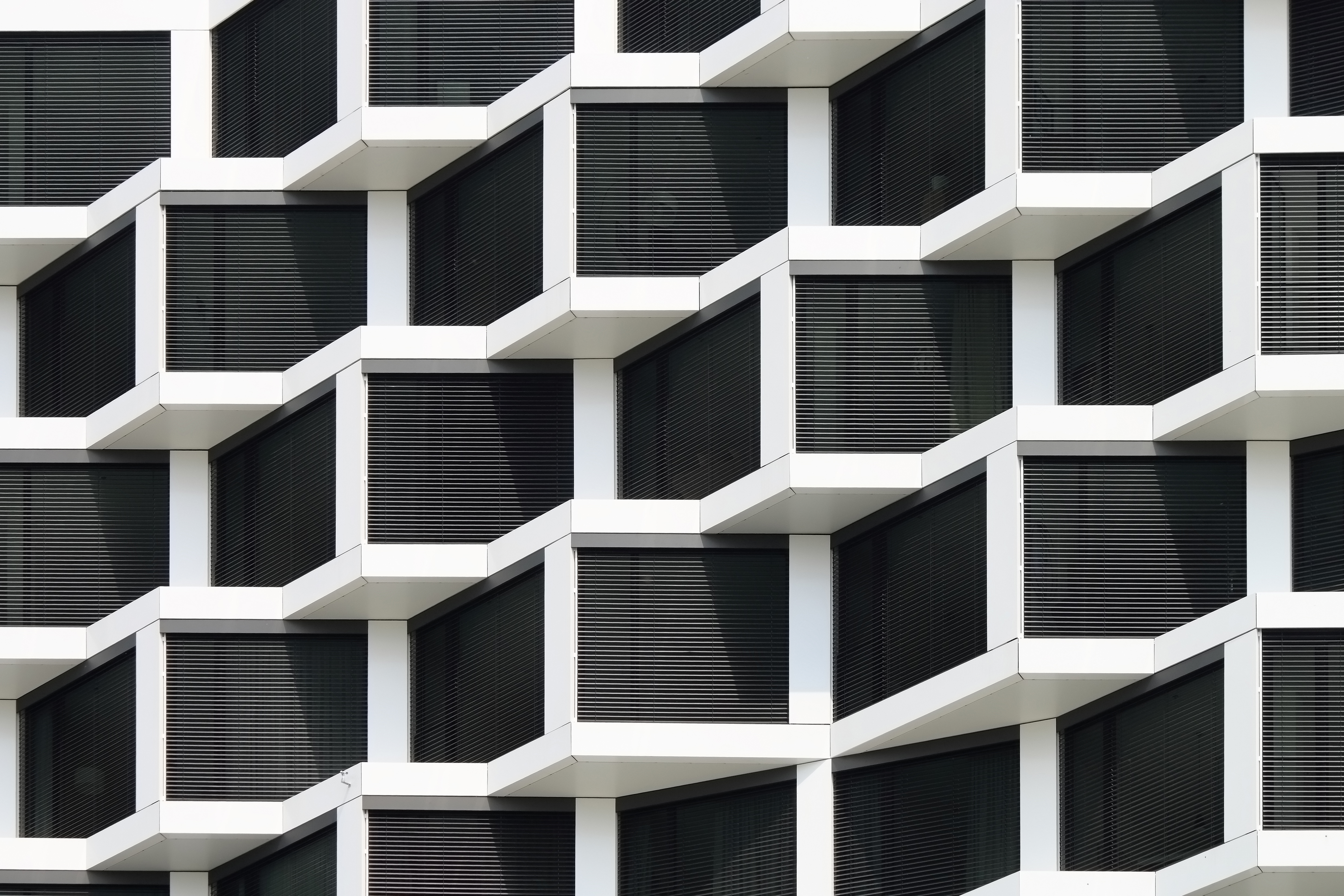
Facade of a modern residential building with automated blinds

== See also ==
- Curtain
- Home automation
- Mini blind
- Robotic window cleaner
- Sudare
- Window treatment

== Sources ==
- Madill, Ellen (1995). The Basic Textbook of Window Fashions for Design and Business. G & W McNamara Publishing, Incorporated.
- Abercrombie, S. (1995). George Nelson: The Design of Modern Design. MIT Press. ISBN 978-0-262-51116-2.
