= Jalousie window =

Window composed of adjustable parallel louvres set in a frame

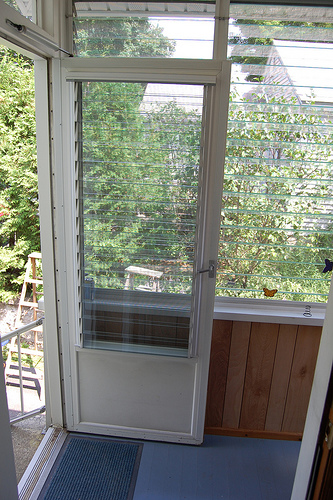
Glass jalousie window and storm door, common in mid-20th-century homes in warm climates

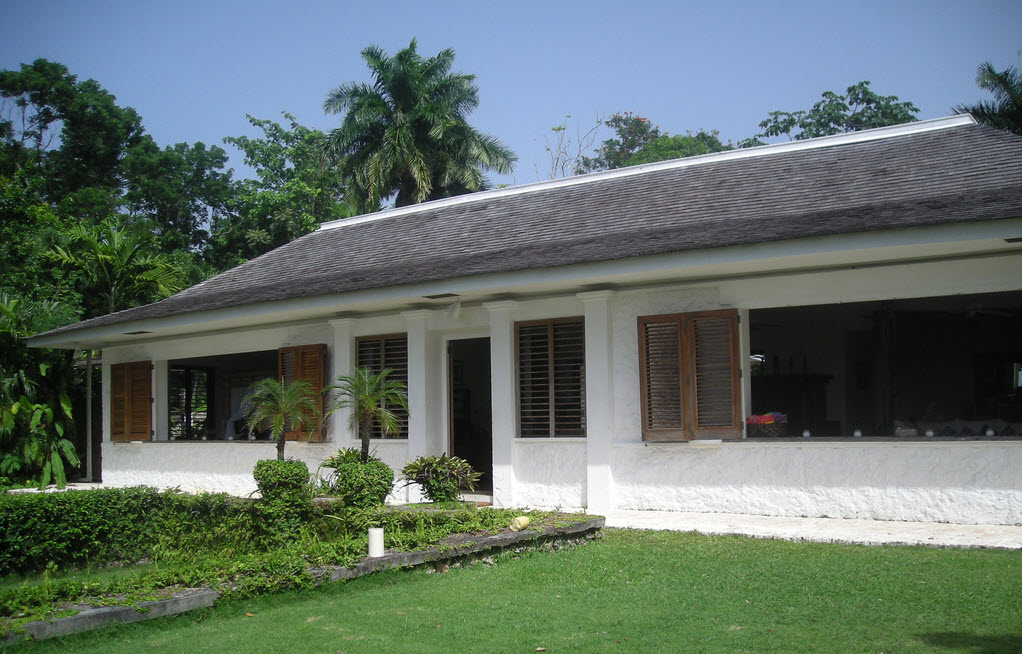
Wooden jalousies were chosen in 1946 by Ian Fleming for his Jamaica estate, Goldeneye.

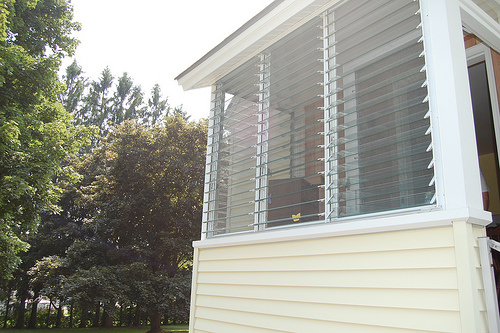
Glass jalousies viewed from outside

A jalousie window (UK: /ˈdʒælʊziː/, US: /ˈdʒæləsiː/), louvred window (Australia, New Zealand, Pacific Islands, Southeast Asia, United Kingdom), jalousie, ventilator, or jalosy is a window composed of parallel slats of glass, acrylic, or wood set in a frame. The louvres are joined onto a track so that they may be tilted open and shut in unison to control airflow, usually by turning a crank.

== Etymology ==
Jalousie is the French word for "jealousy". It originated in 18th century France from the Italian word geloso, which means "jealous" or "screen", as in to screen something from view.

Because of their slatted louvres, jalousie windows protect the interior of the house from jealous, peering eyes (when not made of a transparent material like glass).

== Design ==
Joseph W. Walker of Malden, Massachusetts, applied for a US patent for a basic louvered window in 1900. He was issued patent no. 687705 on November 26, 1901. A popular hand-cranked glass, aluminum and screen window combination was later designed by American engineer Van Ellis Huff and found widespread use in temperate climates before the advent of air conditioning. Jalousie windows were a popular feature in mid-century modern houses, especially those built in warm and humid climates.

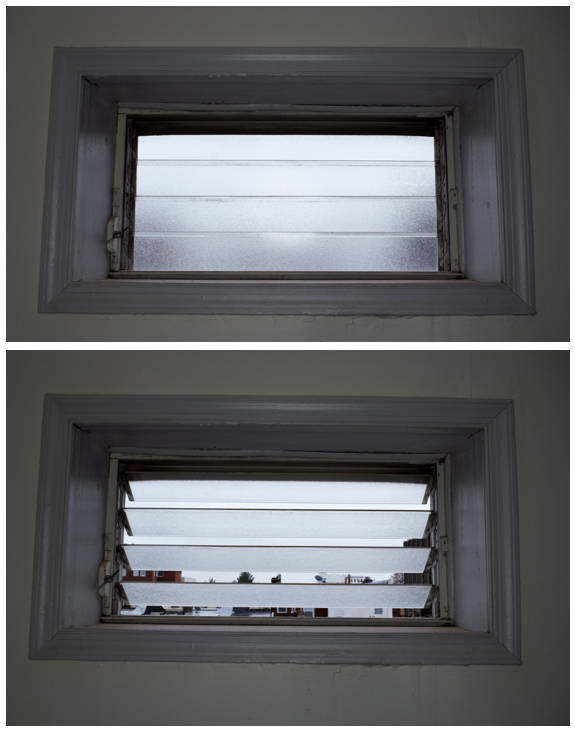
A jalousie window in the closed and open position

== Use ==
Jalousie windows maximize natural ventilation by allowing airflow through the entire window area. Historically made only of wooden slats or glass panes, they are well suited to mild-winter climates. With mass production they became very common throughout homes in mid-20th-century Florida, Hawaii, Puerto Rico, southern California, the Deep South, and Latin America. In cooler regions they were used in porches and sunrooms. They were also widely used in mobile homes during the 1950s and 1960s before most manufacturers began switching to sliding and sash windows in subsequent decades. Modern jalousie windows may be high-performance architectural windows, and some have even been featured in buildings which received awards for excellence in residential design and sustainable living. Jalousie windows have evolved over time and these days can be seen as a design element as well as a technical device to use natural ventilation and temperature control. They are also used more widely in commercial projects.

== Efficacy ==
A commonly accepted advantage of jalousie windows is their ability to be left part-way open in heavy rains as a way to maintain desirable ventilation, whether during a sunshower or prolonged tropical storm. An experiment in 1960 tested the efficacy of jalousie windows in tropical climates to exclude rain while still allowing for air flow. A major issue with excluding rain while allowing air flow is that both tend to come from the same direction. The angled slatted jalousie windows give the impression of solving this issue, however, the actual efficacy of the windows to let in air while keeping out water was deemed unsatisfactory by the study's authors.

Jalousie windows also have several other drawbacks. Traditional style jalousie windows offer poor overall resistance to water penetration and drafts and are difficult to positively secure, as their slats are easily and silently removed. In addition to the inability to keep out water, they do not provide a secure barrier to keep air conditioned air inside. Also, the metal parts which make up the windows moving mechanism are prone to corrosion in humid environments, leading to damage such as broken or missing cranks. Jalousie windows are objects of scorn for many Floridians, as the windows are unable to keep out human and insect home invaders. Modern manufacturers have improved their designs of jalousie windows to address these problems. Many market their products as having greater security and energy efficiency compared to earlier versions.

== Mid-century modern advertising ==
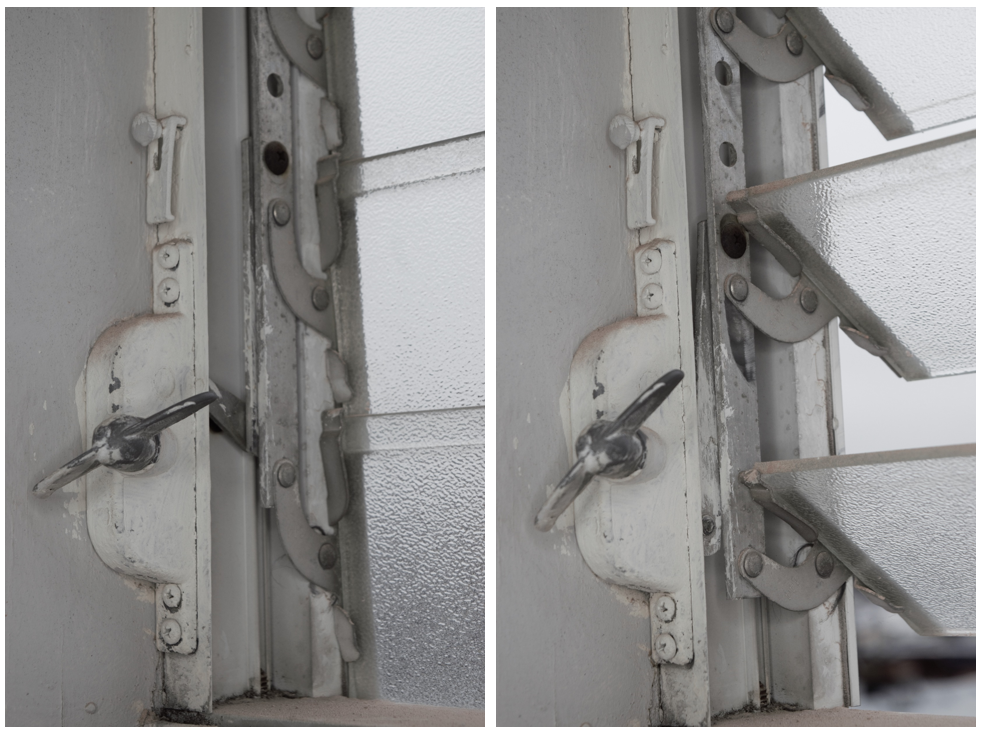
The crank of a jalousie window in the closed and open position

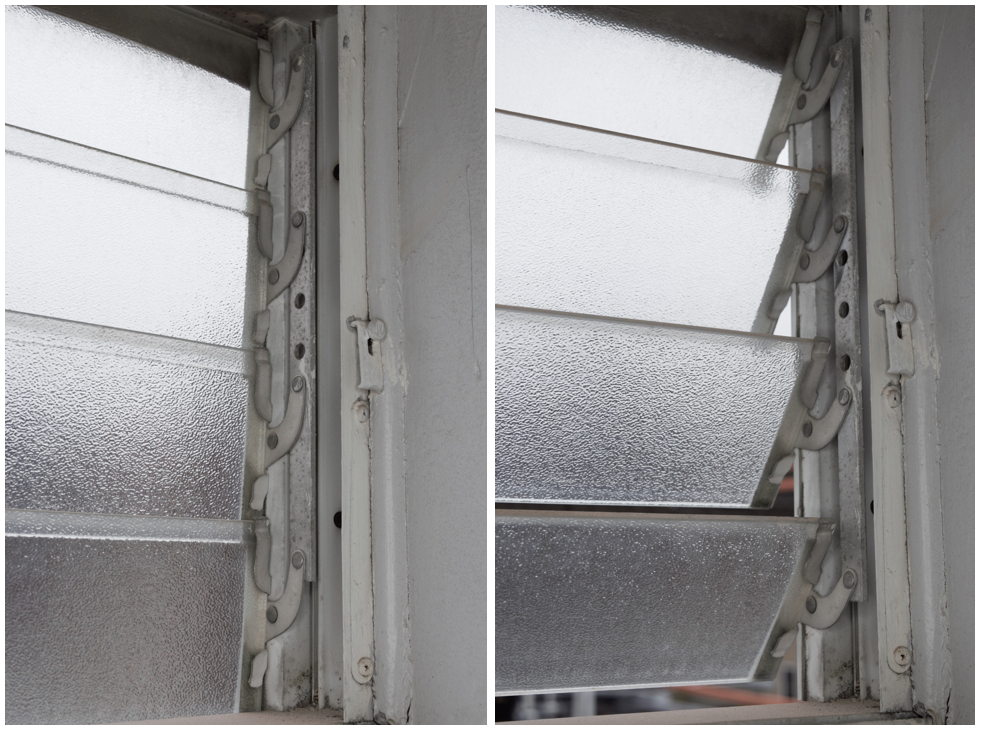
The louvres of a jalousie window in the closed and open position

Many companies manufactured jalousie windows during the 20th century, and there are multiple surviving examples of advertisements from this period which demonstrate how the windows were marketed to consumers. The advertisements tended to stress how jalousie windows provide ventilation, privacy, rain-proofing, and an extra room in winter. Companies like StormMaster claimed their jalousies provided "winter warmth and summer comfort". Others, like Ludman WindoTite, promoted their product by declaring how the brand's windows have "transformed the Jones' front porch", which is a reference to the concept of keeping up with the Joneses. The VentVue company took a different approach to their advertising copy, instead stressing how their jalousies make "every window a picture window", and states that they are fashionable choice for new constructions and replacements.

== See also ==
- Louver
- Window blind
