= Van Ellis Huff =

American inventor (1894–1987)

- Born: 1894
- Died: 1987 (aged 92–93)
- Education: University of Florida
- Known for: Popularizing the jalousie window

Van Ellis Huff (1894 – 1987) was a University of Florida trained engineer who popularized residential use of a combination jalousie window. Drawing inspiration from common wooden slat windows he'd become familiar with in the Bahamas, he designed a hand-cranked glass, aluminum and screen window version that found widespread use in temperate climates before the advent of air conditioning.

Fitted also in cooler regions in porches and sunrooms, jalousies became a multimillion-dollar industry and the company Huff had built to manufacture them prospered. However, amid complaints over underbidding and his salesmen's tactics, Huff sold his share in 1956 and retired.

Huff is sometimes referred to inaccurately as the "inventor" of the jalousie window. The first patent for such a window, #687705, was applied for on Nov. 26, 1901, by Joseph W. Walker.
