= Window covering =

Material used to cover a window for functional purposes

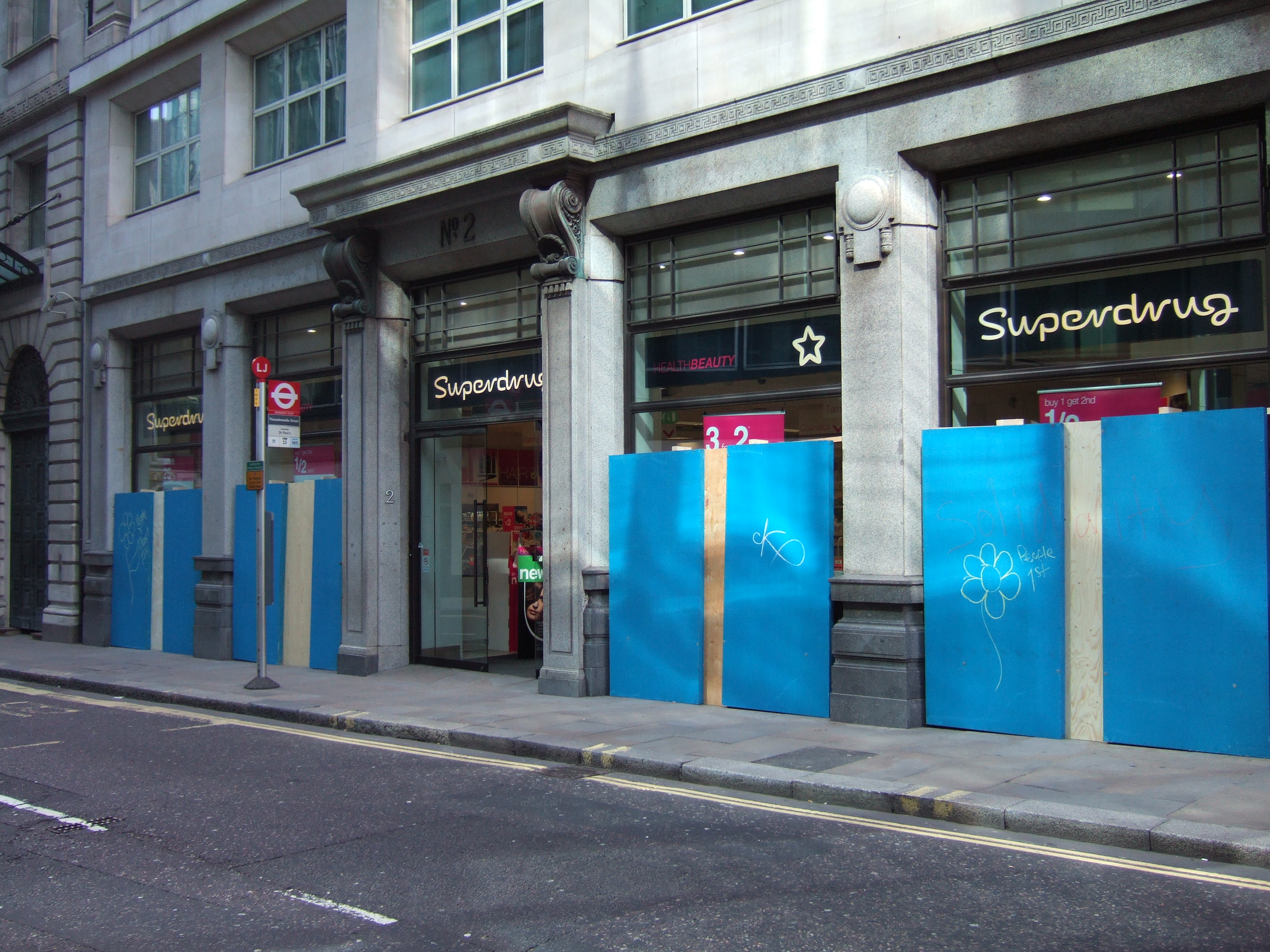
A Superdrug store with boarded windows during the 2009 G-20 London summit protests

Window coverings are considered any type of materials used to cover a window to manage sunlight, privacy, and insulation (weatherproofing etc.), as opposed to window treatments, which are used for purely decorative purposes.

== Description and design ==
Window coverings and treatments comprise materials used to cover a window to manage sunlight, privacy, additional weatherproofing or for purely decorative purposes. Window coverings are typically used on the interior side of windows, but exterior solutions are also available.

Window coverings may be used to manage overheating and glare issues due to sunlight. Designers may consider these variables in the context of visual comfort indices, which include light quantity (sufficient light to perform tasks), direct sunlight (which may lead to overheating), light uniformity (light distribution over the task plane), and glare. Window coverings can provide a sense of privacy. It is important to consider both privacy in terms of the view from the outside in and from the inside out. Poor privacy is often caused when windows are located on the ground floor, or face nearby neighboring high-rise buildings. Nonetheless, if occupants are not satisfied with the privacy the window provides, window coverings will be used to avoid it. Window coverings can also be applied temporarily to protect windows in storm conditions (such as hurricane shutters) or for extra thermal performance in winter to protect against heat loss through windows (such as insulated blinds or window inserts). Window coverings may be selected by building usage and occupant activity in the room. The amount of daylight needed in the room will differ depending on room type. For information on daylighting metrics that may be affected by window covering use, please reference the daylighting page. Aesthetic qualities of window coverings should also be considered, such as how the color, material, and style match the rest of the interior space.

Window coverings can also affect view quality through the windows. View quality can be expressed through three main variables: content (what an occupant sees), access (how much view can be seen from the occupant's position), and clarity (how clearly an occupant can see the content). Partially closing curtains or pulling shades down part-way would affect view quality by limiting view access. Using small aperture shades such as fabric roller shades would primarily affect view quality through a change in view clarity. View clarity can be assessed by visual acuity, contrast sensitivity, and color perception. The color, as well as aperture size, known as Openness Factor, or OF, are two variables of fabric shades that can change view clarity perception. Darker fabric shades with larger openness factors generally achieve higher view clarity.

The impact of window coverings on view quality is of interest for designers, manufacturers, and researchers. However, there is limited research available on the topic of view quality, "due to its complex nature, insufficient funding, and a lack of coordinated effort to move the field forward."

== Types ==
Types of coverings include:

- Curtains and drapes
- Window blinds, including:
  - Venetian blinds: Natural wood, Faux wood, Vinyl, Aluminum
  - Vertical blinds
  - Mini blinds: Vinyl, Aluminum, Micro blinds
- Window shutters, including:
  - traditional Colonial style & plantation shutters with larger louver sizes
- Window shades, including:
  - Roman shades
  - Roller shades
  - Pleated shades
  - Sheer shades
  - Cellular shades
- Solar screens
- Various types of boarding, nailed or screwed to the window casing, can be used as temporary window covering.

=== Dynamic window coverings ===
Window coverings can be static or dynamic. Static window coverings are fixed in place while dynamic window coverings can change their status manually or automatically. Dynamic window coverings can control daylight and solar energy entering the building. Dynamic window coverings are effective in adapting to changing outdoor and indoor conditions. Optimal control of window coverings can increase occupant comfort (visual and thermal comfort) while saving building energy use (lighting, cooling, and heating energy). Typical dynamic window coverings include automated blinds and automatic shades.

Window blinds and shades can be controlled to avoid glare while introducing daylight to the building. The height of the blind and the angle of the slat can be determined by daylighting demand and solar positions (azimuth, altitude). By controlling the height of shades or blinds, the optimal amount of sunlight can be introduced to meet the target horizontal illuminance (work plane illuminance). The optimal angle of the blind slats can protect occupants from direct sunlight (cut-off angle strategy). Glare can also be controlled by glare index-based models, such as discomfort glare probability (DGP).

Window coverings can be controlled to minimize overheating. When the sunlight is strong, fully closed window coverings can decrease the cooling load while maintaining occupants' thermal comfort. When the outdoor temperature is extremely low, fully closed drapes or curtains can reduce the heating load.

Control of window coverings can also be determined by occupants' personal preferences. The occupant may prefer to close the window coverings due to privacy issues. Indoor conditions, such as furniture configuration or occupant position, may also affect the shade or blind control.

Dynamic window coverings are important in the area of building automation.

== Alternatives ==
- Smart glass is used with high-rise buildings.
- Window film can be applied to tint glass.

== See also ==
- Window valance, a type of window treatment
