= Mini blind =

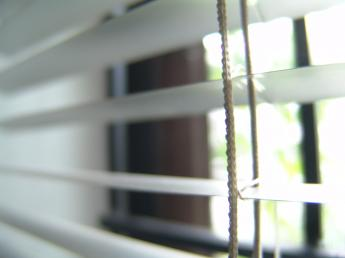
The slats of a mini blind

A mini blind is a type of horizontal window blind made of long, narrow slats held together by string. Each slat is less than half the width of that in a regular venetian blind, measuring 15 mm (0.59 in) or 25 mm (0.98 in), and often made of aluminium. The slats are opened and closed by rotating a rod or by directly pulling a string, and they are raised and lowered by pulling other strings.

In the United Kingdom, the term venetian blind also covers mini blinds.

== Parts ==
The long horizontal slats are held one above the other by the rungs of ladder cords shaped like a ladder. The lower ends of the legs of the ladder cords are secured to the long rail under the slats. Their upper ends are attached to the drive rod in the housing, the elongated box above the slats. As the drive rod rotates, one leg of each ladder cord moves up while the other moves down, causing the angle of the slats to change. In one design, this rotation is achieved by pushing up or pulling down on a long handle called a tilt wand connected to the drive rod by a lever. Lift cords along the ladder cords are also attached to the rail. They pass through holes in the slats and into the housing above, where they go over pulleys, combine and exit through the cord lock. For safety, it's important that the lock always works. A downward pull on the main lift cord raises the slats by the cords pulling up the rail below the slats. The cord lock holds the main lift cord to keep the slats up until the cord is pulled to release the lock. The safety lock made the cord lock easier to use.

== History ==
Blinds made of narrow, light-weight horizontal wood slats, adjustable to admit or exclude light, were developed in 1794, and called Venetian blinds. The blinds were often used instead of window curtains or shutters. In the 1840s, these blinds were held together by flat strips of cloth instead of by cords perhaps to shade the lift holes and like today they came in various colors. In 1966, a new pulley system was invented which afforded great improvement in the control mechanism. Over time, narrower slats became more common, as they were easier to clean, and they reduced glare at certain settings and their appearance was pleasing to many. In 1946 Henry Sonnenberg and Joe Hunter developed technology and equipment for the production of lightweight aluminum slats (50 mm) for Venetian blinds, and by 1979, 25 mm slats were popular.

The window coverings industry underwent many changes and consolidations from 1981 to 2001. Many products and brands came and went because of technology, trends, consumer tastes and population shifts. Most of the big names in the industry are old companies being run by second- and third-generation family members. The '70s began the era of the mini-blind, and it continued through 1981. People were moving into new homes and apartments. They provided the homeowner a window covering of moderate cost, which could be installed soon after purchase. In 1981, mini-blinds were 70 to 80 percent of the U.S. market in window coverings. It was the middle of what became known in the window coverings industry as the mini-blind era. Then, there was a recession in the late '80s. It reduced mini blind sales drastically. Many mom-and-pop retailers that sold window coverings from a storefront began to be replaced by the large home improvement warehouses. The number of manufacturers also diminished. One leader in window covering production machinery downsized. As a result, another company had to shift its focus from component sales to machinery development. The companies that survived the recession were innovative and learned new avenues of marketing rather than lowering prices. The mini-blind's lead in sales gave way to the other shading systems and by 1996 wood blinds grew in popularity and began catching up with the Venetian blind and the mini-blind.

== Safety ==
Pull and tilt cords are dangerous to young children and pets, as they may cause strangulation. According to Parents for Window Blind Safety, the U.S. Consumer Product Safety Commission (CPSC) logged 502 deaths or injuries of children being strangled by blind cords from 1983 to 2010. Cord retrofit kits include cord stops, tassels and tie down devices which are used to upgrade the blind, but are not always effective; wand-tilt blinds are also safer than cord-tilt. Cordless blinds are the safest alternative, and recommend by the CPSC for homes where small children live or visit. With cordless blinds, the dangling group of pull cords is replaced by a spring motor system. A push or pull on the bottom bar raises or lowers the mini blind rather than using pull cords.

With the agreement of the Window Covering Manufacturers Association (in the United States and Canada), a CPSC rule took effect in the United States on December 15, 2018, requiring all stocked (pre-made) blinds manufactured on this date or later must be cordless or have inaccessible cords. Customers can still custom-order blinds with long cords, for example if needed for a person with a disability.

== Manufacturing ==
Slats are made by continuous casting. Casting is the pouring of molten metal or plastic into a mold. Continuous casting might involve a series of molds on a wheel or a conveyor belt or the pushing of semi-solid material through a hole in a certain shape, as in the making of noodles.

== See also ==
- Window blind
- Window shutter
