= Wall =

Vertical structure, usually solid, that defines and sometimes protects an area

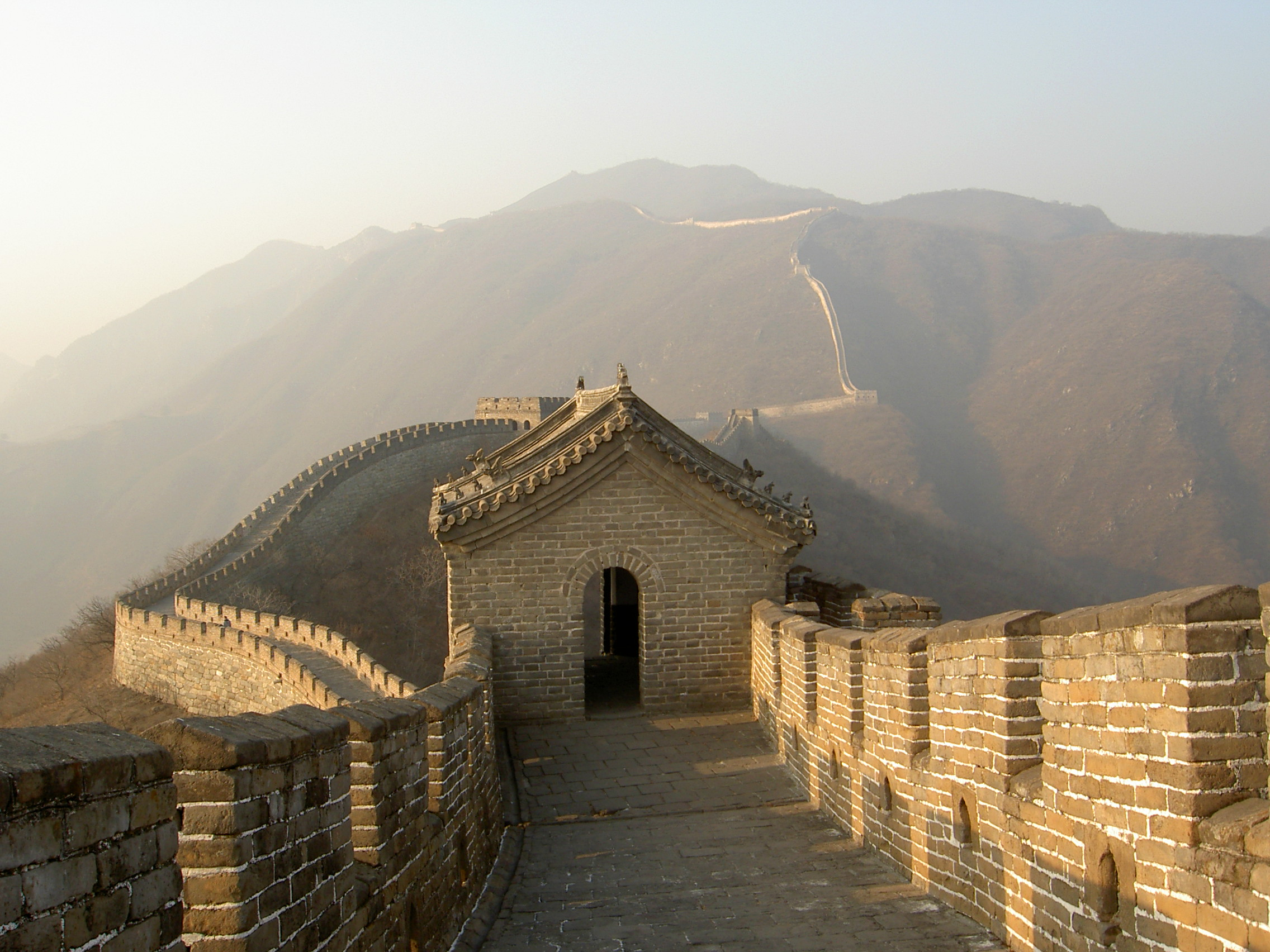
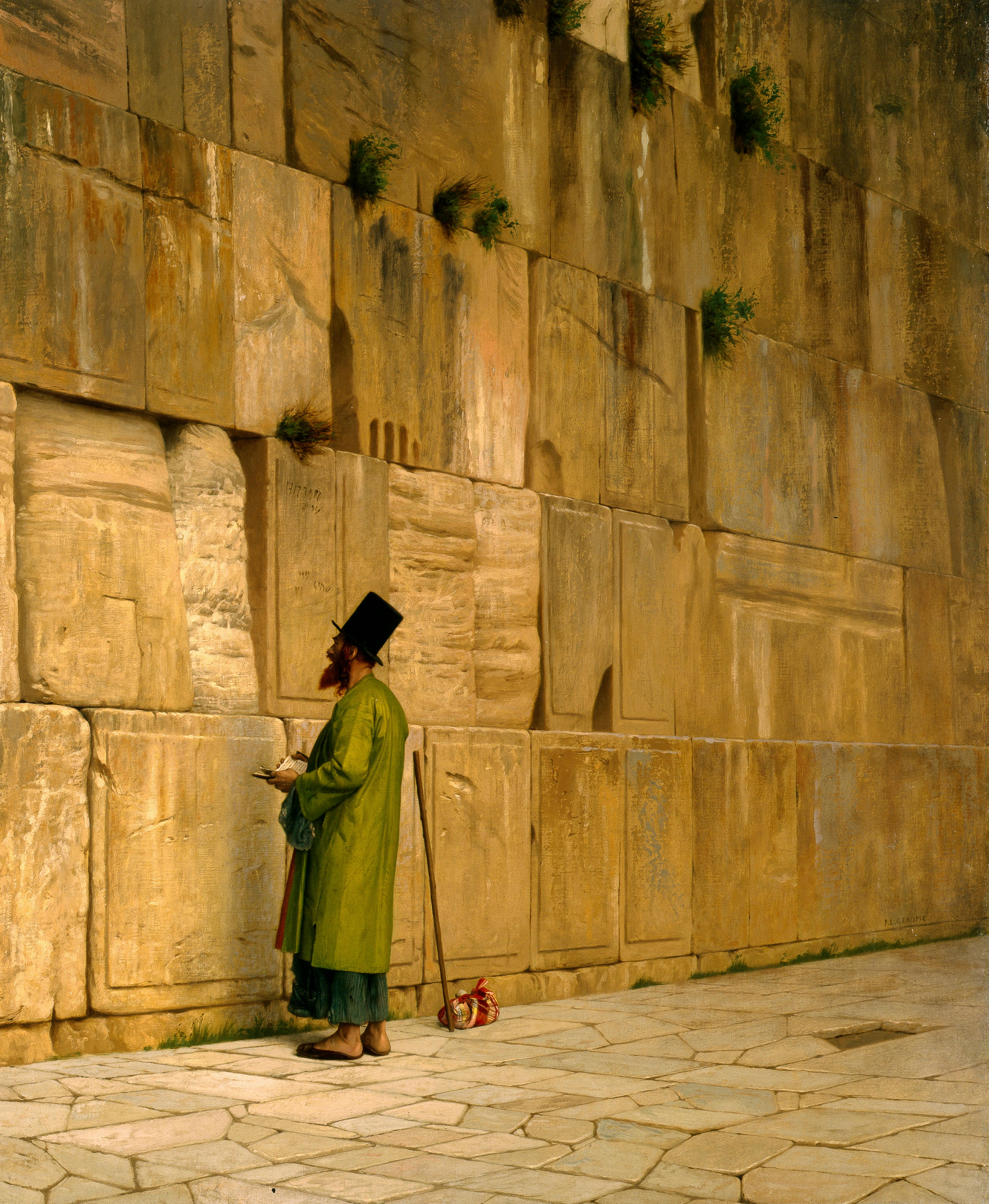
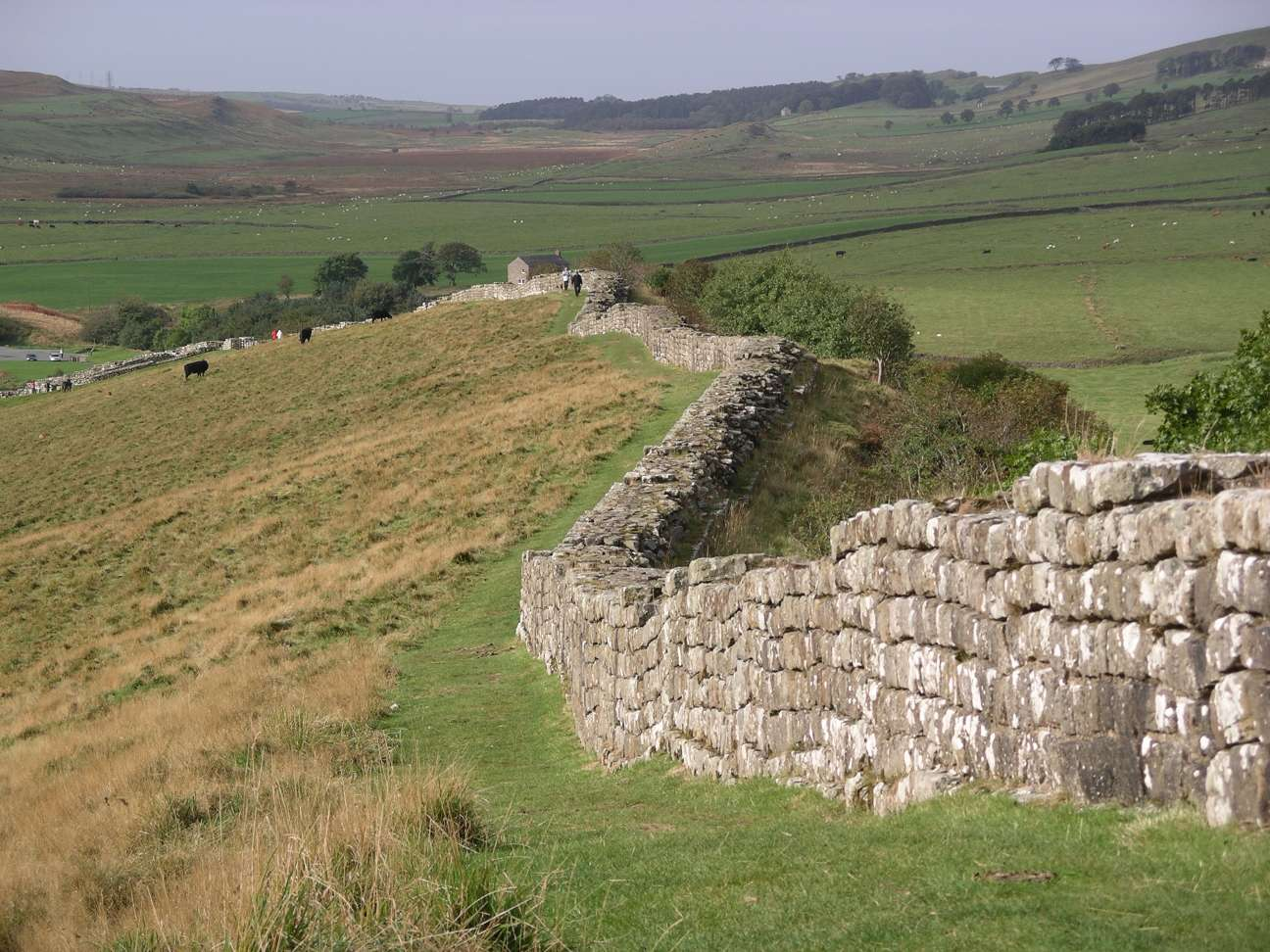
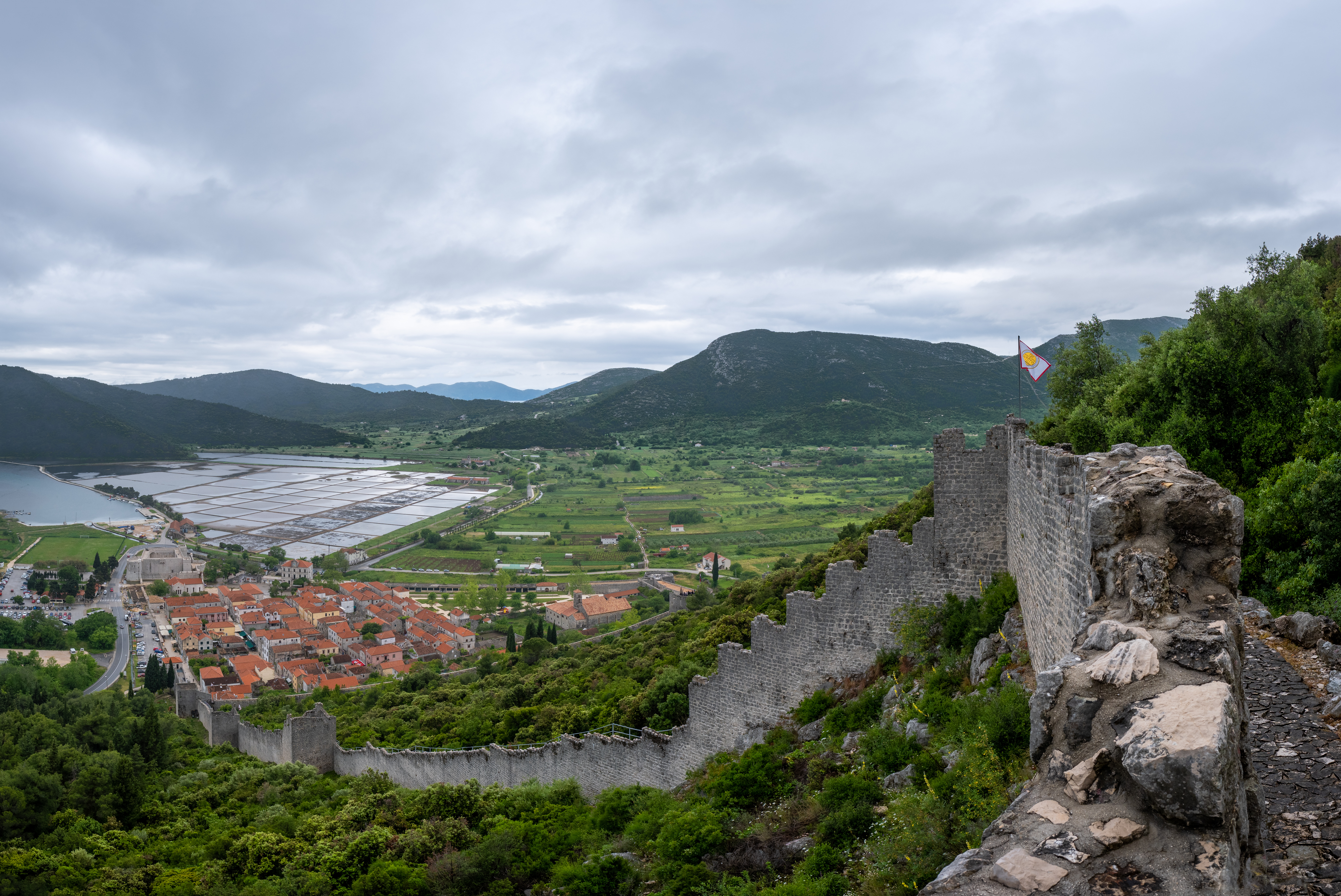
Great Wall of China, Western Wall,
Hadrian's Wall, Walls of Ston

A wall is a structure and a surface that defines an area; carries a load; provides security, shelter, or soundproofing; or serves a decorative purpose. There are various types of walls, including border barriers between countries, brick walls, defensive walls in fortifications, and retaining walls that hold back dirt, stone, water, or noise. Walls can also be found in buildings, where they support roofs, floors, and ceilings, enclose spaces, and provide shelter and security.

The construction of walls can be categorized into framed walls and mass-walls. Framed walls transfer the load to the foundation through posts, columns, or studs and typically consist of structural elements, insulation, and finish elements. Mass-walls are made of solid materials such as masonry, concrete, adobe, or rammed earth. Walls may also house utilities like electrical wiring or plumbing and must conform to local building and fire codes.

Walls have historically served defensive purposes, and the term "wall" originally referred to defensive walls and ramparts. Examples of famous defensive walls include the Great Wall of China and Hadrian's Wall. Walls can also be used for decorative or aesthetic purposes.

== Etymology ==
"weall", an Old English spelling of 'wall'

The term wall comes from the Latin vallum meaning "an earthen wall or rampart set with palisades, a row or line of stakes, a wall, a rampart, fortification", while the Latin word murus refers to a defensive stone wall. English uses "wall" to mean an external wall, the internal sides of a room, or both as a unit, but this is not universal; many languages have separate words for the internal one and the external one. This distinction can be seen in German between Wand and Mauer, and in Spanish between pared and muro.

== Defensive wall ==
The word wall originally referred to defensive walls and ramparts.

== Building wall ==
The purposes of walls in buildings are to support roofs, floors and ceilings; to enclose a space as part of the building envelope along with a roof to give buildings form; and to provide shelter and security. In addition, the wall may house various types of utilities such as electrical wiring or plumbing. Walls may or may not be load-bearing. Walls are required to conform to the local building and/or fire codes.

Wall construction falls into two basic categories: framed walls or mass-walls. In framed walls, the load is transferred to the foundation through posts, columns or studs. Framed walls most often have three or more separate components: the structural elements (such as 2×4 studs in a house wall), insulation, and finish elements or surfaces (such as drywall or panelling). Mass-walls are of a solid material, such as masonry, concrete including slipform stonemasonry, log building, cordwood construction, adobe, rammed earth, cob, earthbag construction, bottles, tin cans, straw-bale construction, or ice.

There are three basic methods through which walls control water intrusion: moisture storage, drained cladding, or face-sealed cladding. Moisture storage is typical of stone and brick mass-wall buildings where moisture is absorbed and released by the walls of the structure itself. Drained cladding, also known as screened walls, acknowledges moisture will penetrate the cladding so a moisture barrier such as housewrap or felt paper inside the cladding provides a second line of defense, and sometimes a drainage plane or air gap allows a path for the moisture to drain down through and exit the wall. Sometimes ventilation is provided in addition to the drainage plane such as in rainscreen construction. Face-sealed cladding, also called barrier wall or perfect barrier cladding, relies on maintaining a leak-free surface of the cladding. Examples of face sealed cladding are the early exterior insulation finishing systems, structural glazing, metal clad panels, and corrugated metal.

Building walls frequently become works of art, externally and internally, such as when featuring mosaic work or when murals are painted on them; or as design foci when they exhibit textures or painted finishes for effect.

=== Curtain wall ===
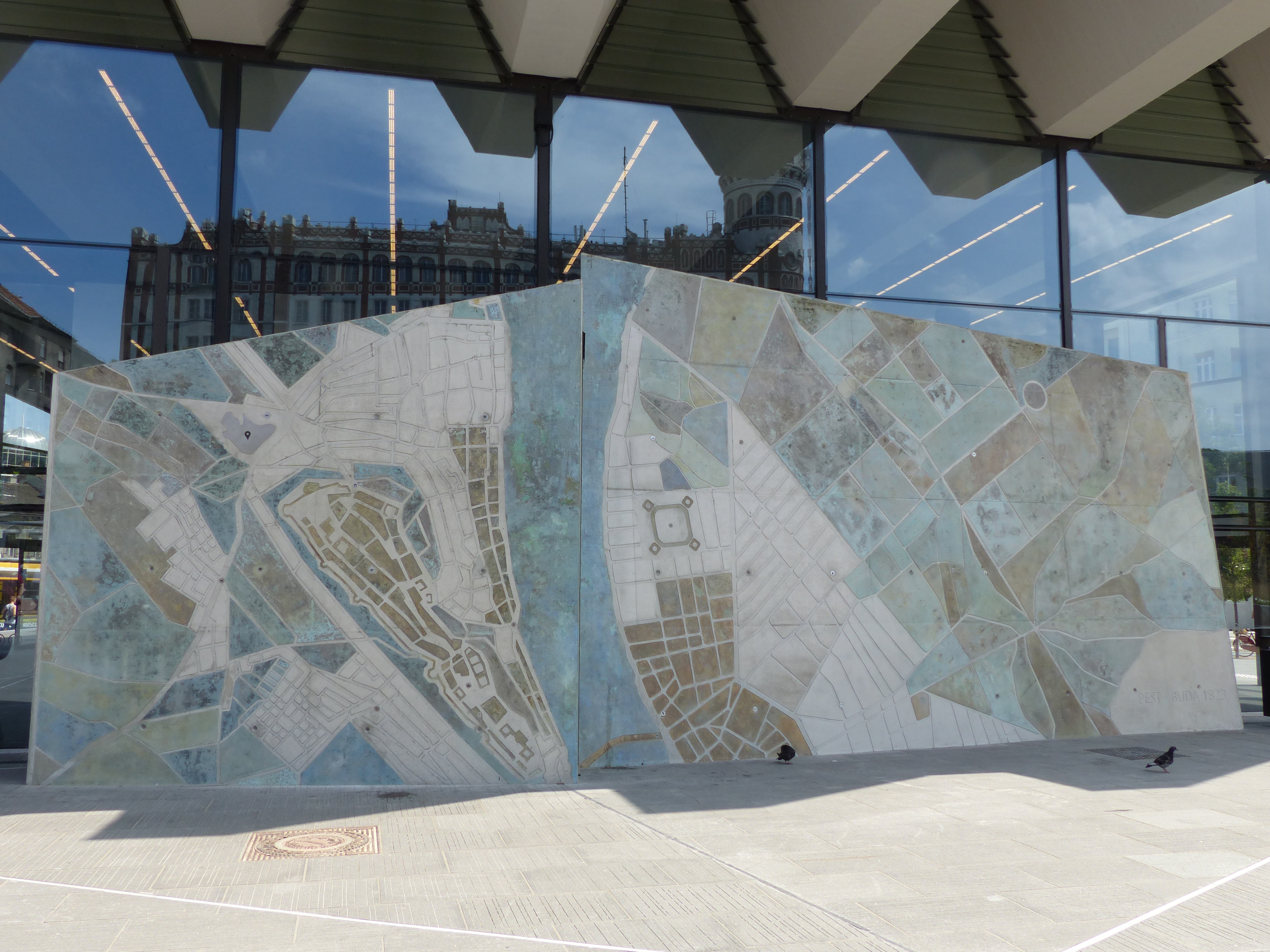
Wall art in Budapest's Széll Kálmán Square

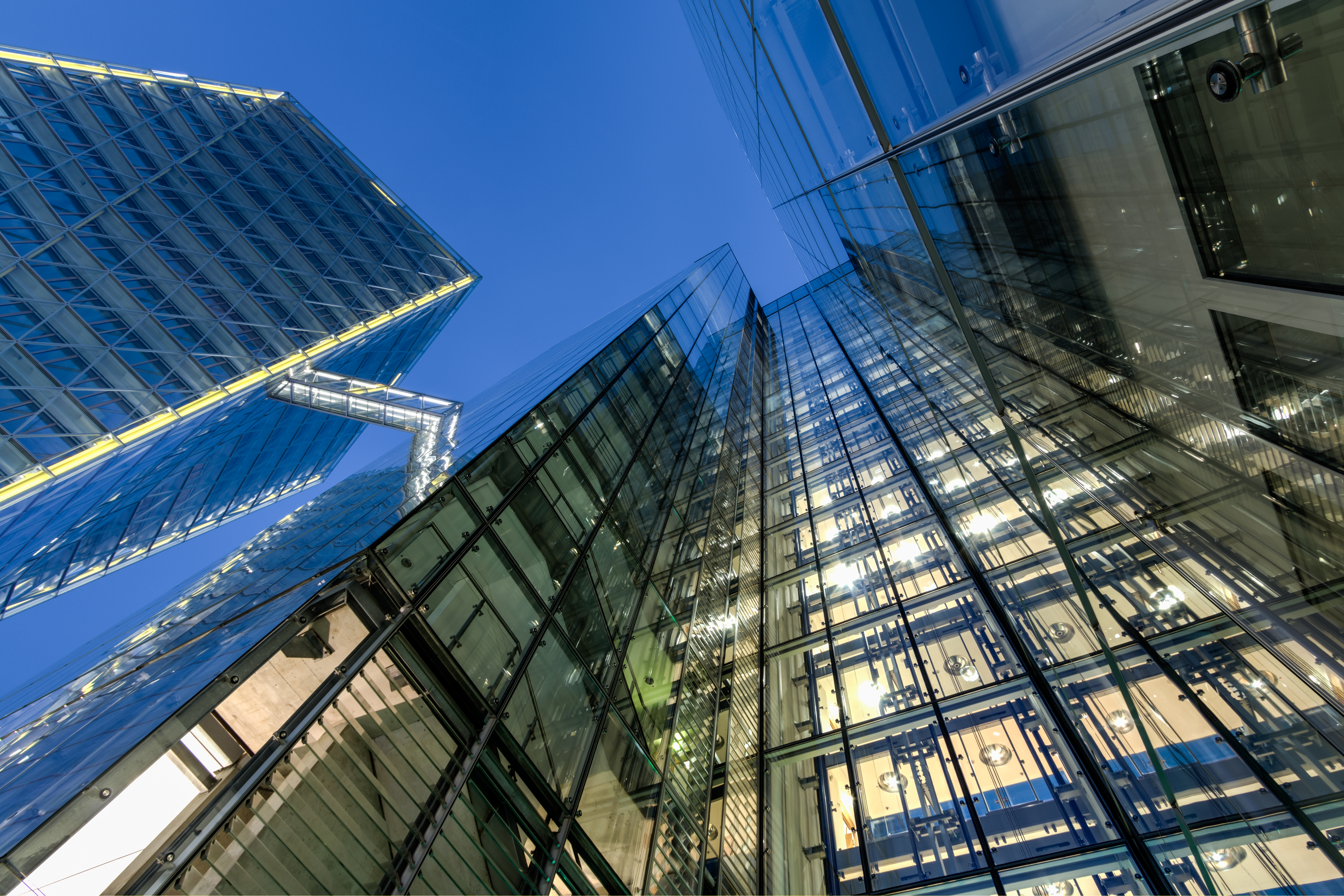
Glass curtain walls on a contemporary German skyscraper

In architecture and civil engineering, curtain wall refers to a building facade that is not load-bearing but provides decoration, finish, front, face, or historical preservation.

=== Precast wall ===
Precast walls are walls which have been manufactured in a factory and then shipped to where it is needed, ready to install. Compared to walls made of other materials, such as brick, it is faster to install and may have a lower cost.

=== Mullion wall ===
Mullion walls are a structural system that carries the load of the floor slab on prefabricated panels around the perimeter.

=== Partition wall ===
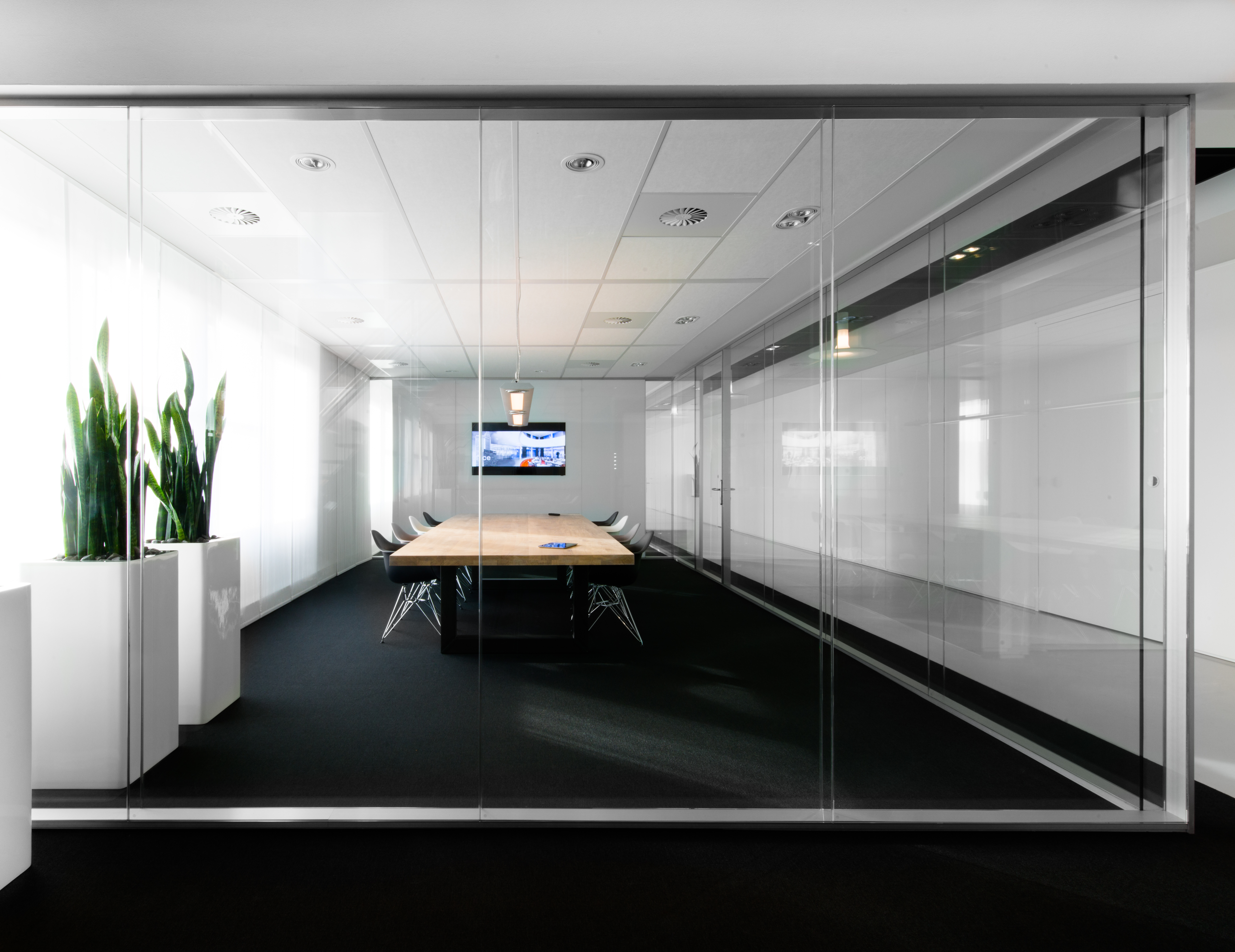
Glass partition walls

A partition wall is a (usually thin) wall that is used to separate or divide a room, primarily a pre-existing one. Partition walls are usually not load-bearing, and can be constructed out of many materials, including steel panels, bricks, cloth, plastic, plasterboard, wood, blocks of clay, terracotta, concrete, and glass (such as sheet glass).

A glass partition wall is a series of individual toughened glass panels mounted in wood or metal framing. They may be suspended from or slide along a robust aluminium ceiling track. The system does not require the use of a floor guide, which allows easy operation and an uninterrupted threshold.

A timber partition consists of a wooden framework, supported on the floor or by side walls. Metal lath and plaster, properly laid, forms a reinforced partition wall. Partition walls constructed from fibre cement backer board are popular as bases for tiling in kitchens or in wet areas like bathrooms. Galvanized sheet fixed to wooden or steel members are mostly adopted in works of temporary character. Plain or reinforced partition walls may also be constructed from concrete, including pre-cast concrete blocks. Metal framed partitioning is also available. This partition consists of track (used primarily at the base and head of the partition) and studs (vertical sections fixed into the track typically spaced at 24, 16, 12 inches or 60, 40, 30 cm).

Internal wall partitions, also known as office partitioning, are usually made of plasterboard (drywall) or varieties of glass. Toughened glass is a common option, as low-iron glass (better known as opti-white glass) increases light and solar heat transmission.

Wall partitions are constructed using beads and tracking that is either hung from the ceiling or fixed into the ground. The panels are inserted into the tracking and fixed. Some wall partition variations specify their fire resistance and acoustic performance rating.

Movable partitions

Movable partitions are walls that open to join two or more rooms into one large floor area. These include:

- Sliding—a series of panels that slide in tracks fixed to the floor and ceiling, similar sliding doors.
- Sliding and folding doors—similar to sliding folding doors, these are good for smaller spans.
- Folding partition walls–a series of interlocking panels suspended from an overhead track that when extended provide an acoustical separation, and when retracted stack against a wall, ceiling, closet, or ceiling pocket.
- Screens—usually constructed of a metal or timber frame fixed with plywood and chipboard and supported with legs for free standing and easy movement.
- Pipe and drape—fixed or telescopic uprights and horizontals provide a ground supported drape system with removable panels.

=== Party wall ===
Party walls are walls that separate buildings or units within a building. They provide fire resistance and sound resistance between occupants in a building. The minimum fire resistance and sound resistance required for the party wall is determined by a building code and may be modified to suit a variety of situations. Ownership of such walls can become a legal issue. It is not a load-bearing wall and may be owned by different people.

=== Infill wall ===
An infill wall is the supported wall that closes the perimeter of a building constructed with a three-dimensional framework structure.

=== Fire wall ===
Fire walls resist spread of fire within or between structures to provide passive fire protection. A delay in the spread of fire gives occupants more time to escape and fire fighters more time to extinguish the fire. Some fire walls allow fire resistive window assemblies, and are made of non-combustible material such as concrete, cement block, brick, or fire-rated drywall. Wall penetrations are sealed with fire-resistive materials. A doorway in a firewall must have a rated fire door. Fire walls provide varying resistance to the spread of fire, typically one to four hours. Firewalls can also act as smoke barriers when constructed vertically from slab to roof deck and horizontally from an exterior wall to exterior wall subdividing a building into sections.

=== Shear wall ===
Shear walls resist lateral forces, such as in an earthquake or severe wind. There are different kinds of shear walls, such as the steel plate shear wall.

=== Knee wall ===
Knee walls are short walls that either support rafters or add height in the top floor rooms of houses. In a 1 1/2-story house, the knee wall supports the half story.

=== Cavity wall ===
Cavity walls are walls made with a space between two "skins" to inhibit heat transfer.

=== Pony wall ===
Pony wall and dwarf wall are general terms for short walls, such as:

- A half wall that only extends partway from floor to ceiling, without supporting anything
- A stem wall—a concrete wall that extends from the foundation slab to the cripple wall or floor joists
- A cripple wall—a framed wall from the stem wall or foundation slab to the floor joists

=== Demountable wall ===
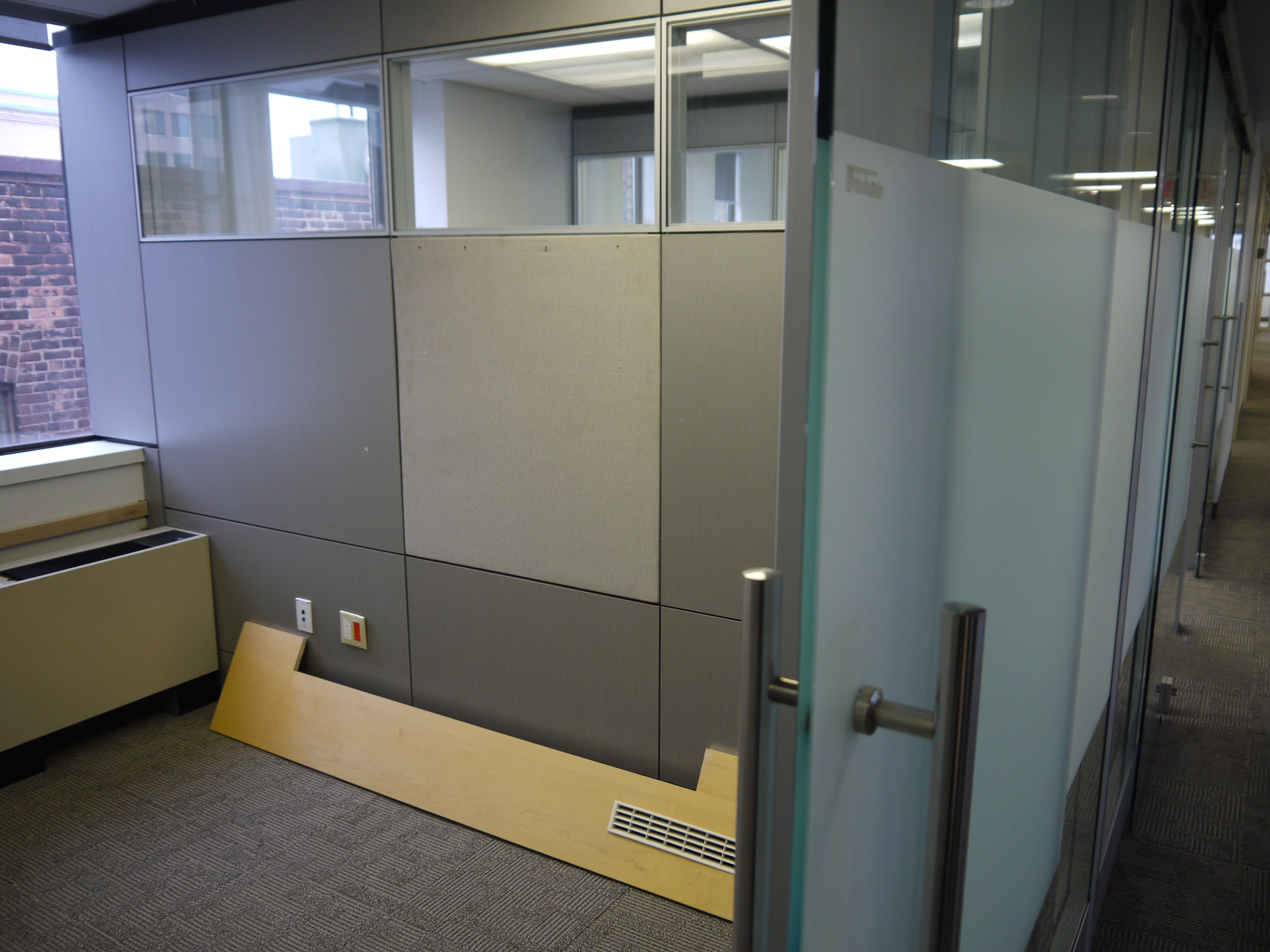
Demountable wall and door in an office building

Demountable walls fall into three different main types:

- Glass walls (unitesed panels or butt joint),
- Laminated particle board walls (this may also include other finishes, such as whiteboards, cork board, magnetic, etc., typically all on purpose-made wall studs)
- Drywall

=== Solar energy ===
A trombe wall in passive solar building design acts as a heat sink.

== Shipbuilding ==
On a ship, a wall that separates major compartments is called a bulkhead. A thinner wall between cabins is called a partition.

== Boundary wall ==
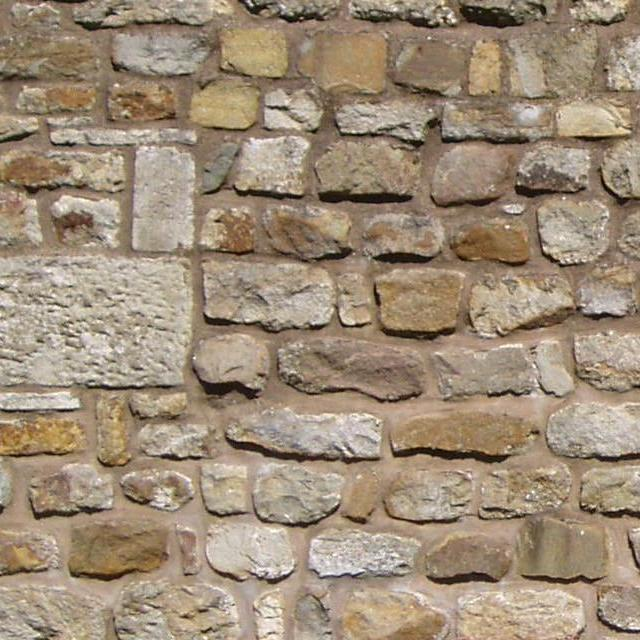
Stone wall of an English barn

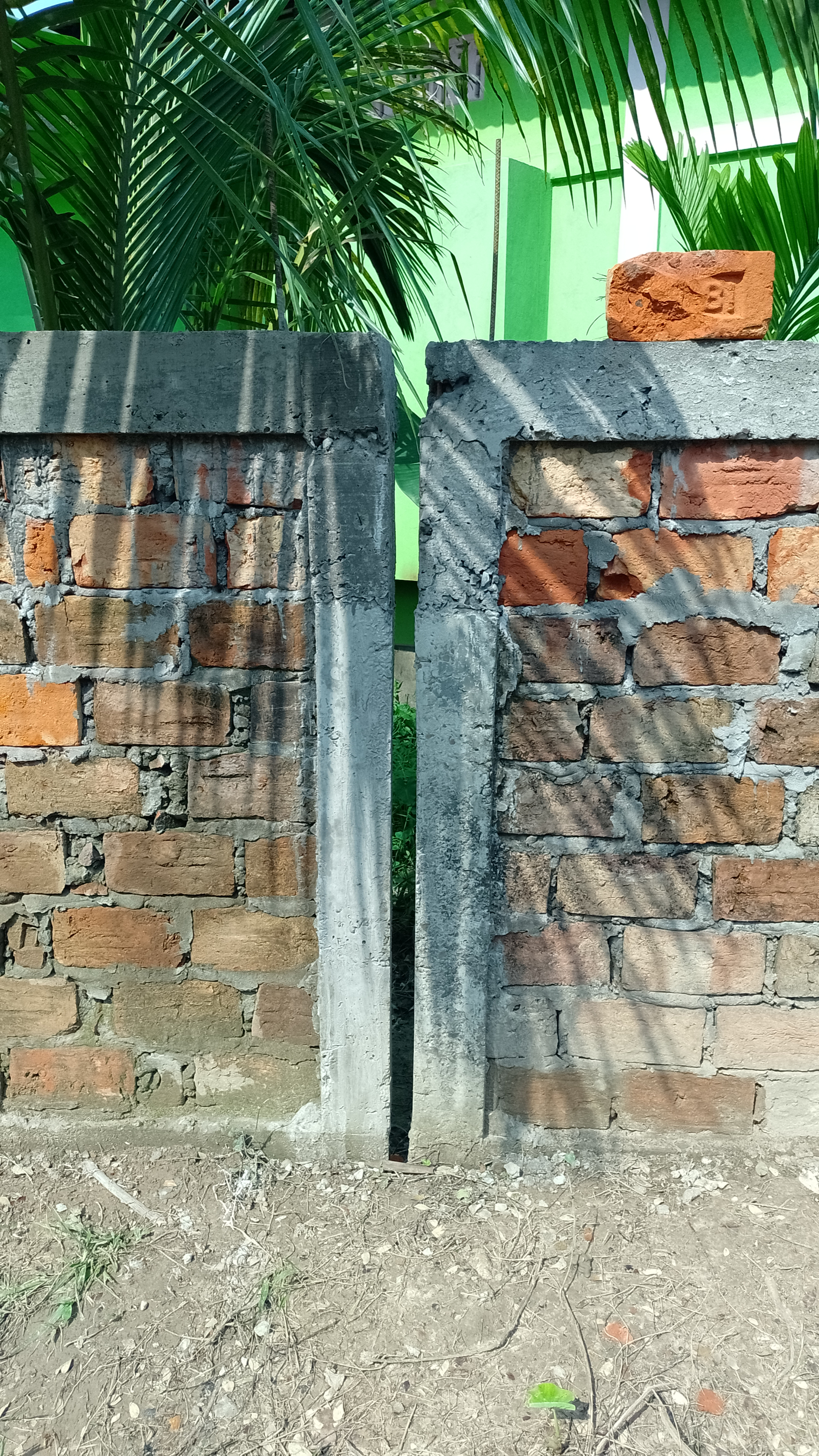
A red bricks boundary wall intersection

Boundary walls include privacy walls, boundary-marking walls on property, and town walls. These intergrade into fences. The conventional differentiation is that a fence is of minimal thickness and often open in nature, while a wall is usually more than a nominal thickness and is completely closed, or opaque. More to the point, an exterior structure of wood or wire is generally called a fence—but one of masonry is a wall. A common term for both is barrier, which is convenient for structures that are partly wall and partly fence—for example the Berlin Wall. Another kind of wall-fence ambiguity is the ha-ha—which is set below ground level to protect a view, yet acts as a barrier (to cattle, for example).

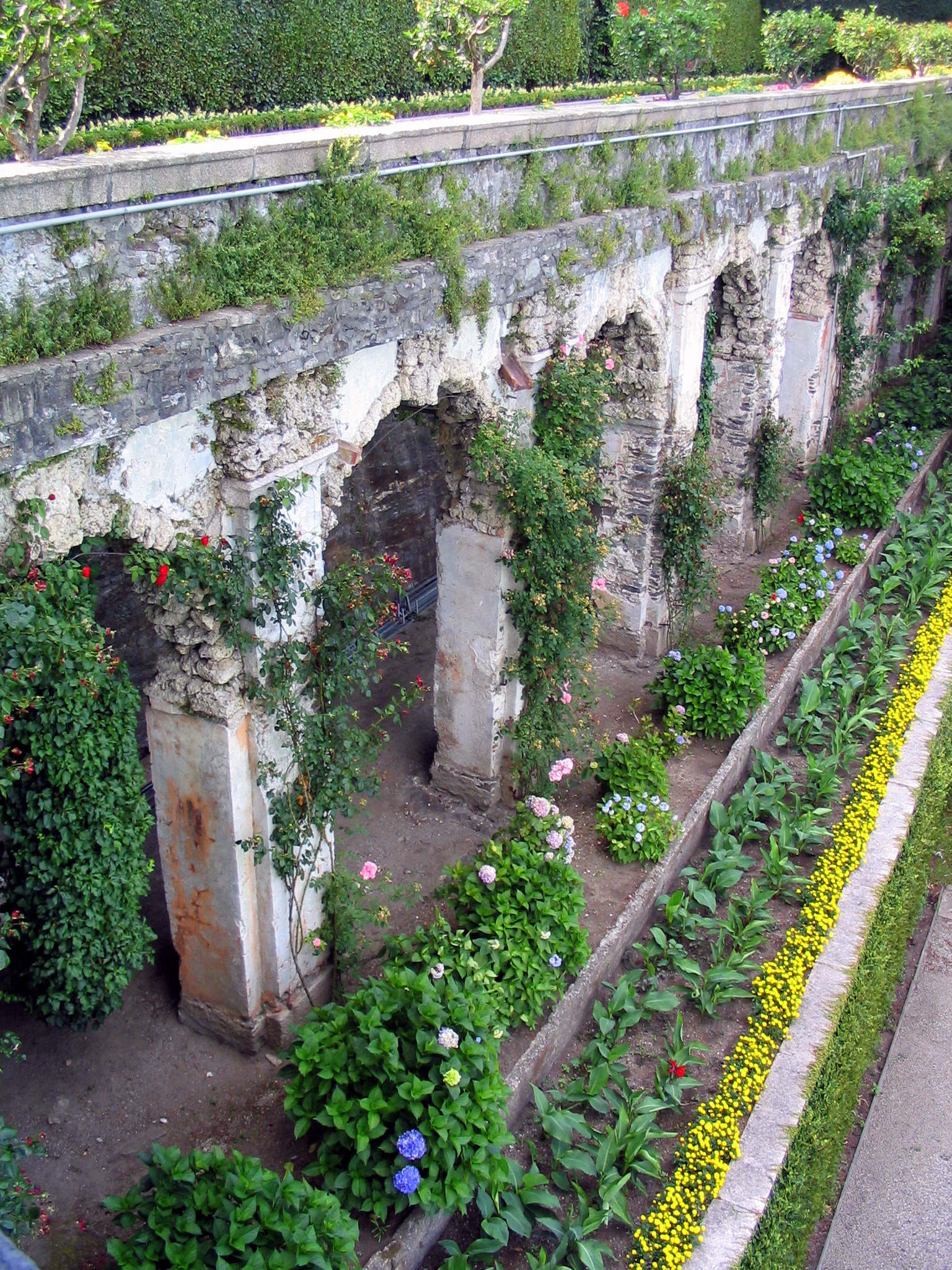
An old Italian wall surrounded by flowers

Before the invention of artillery, many of the world's cities and towns, particularly in Europe and Asia, had defensive or protective walls (also called town walls or city walls). In fact, the English word "wall" derives from Latin vallum—a type of fortification wall. These walls are no longer relevant for defense, so such cities have grown beyond their walls, and many fortification walls, or portions of them, have been torn down—for example in Rome, Italy and Beijing, China. Examples of protective walls on a much larger scale include the Great Wall of China and Hadrian's Wall.

== Border wall ==
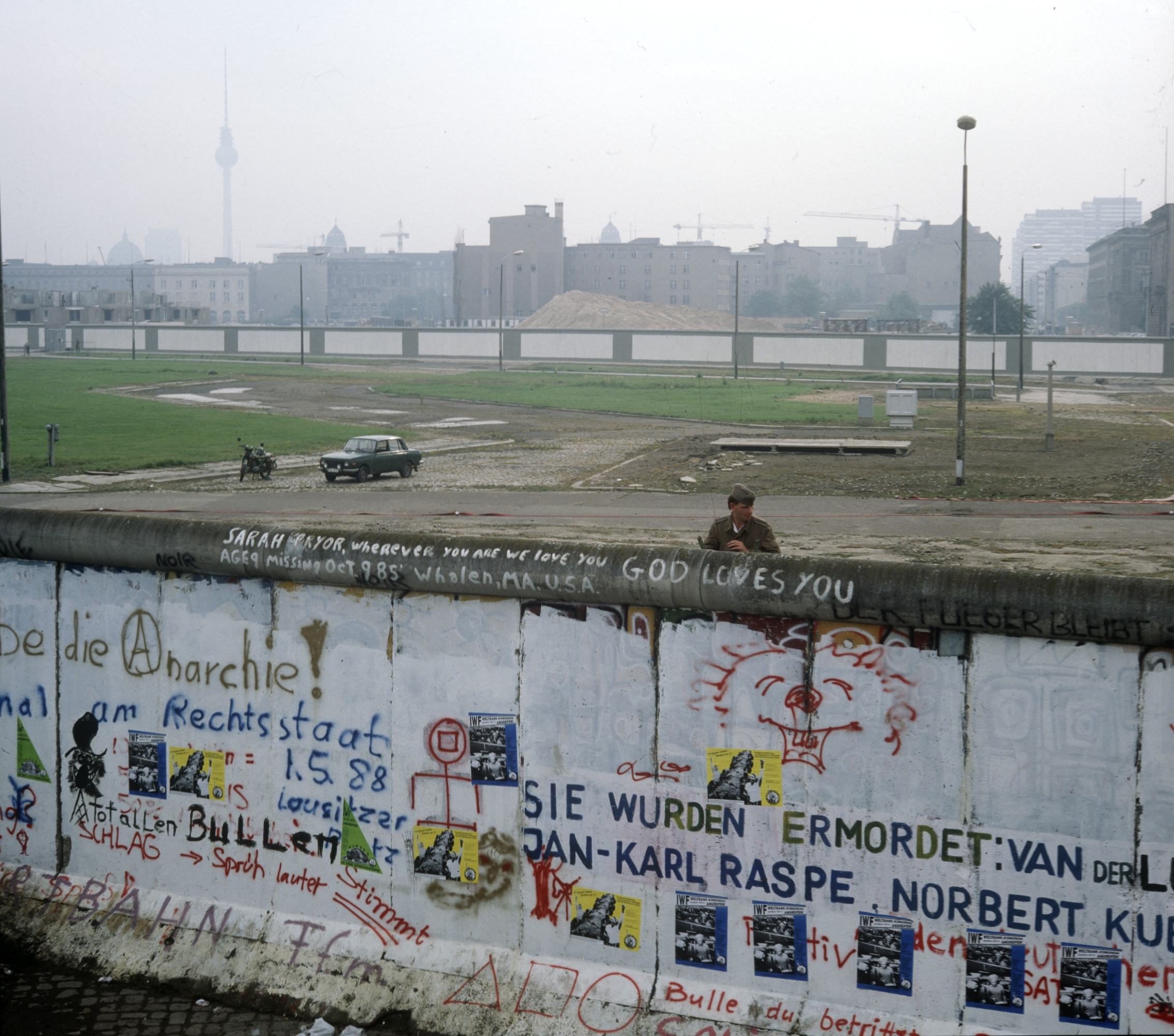
Berlin wall, July 1, 1988

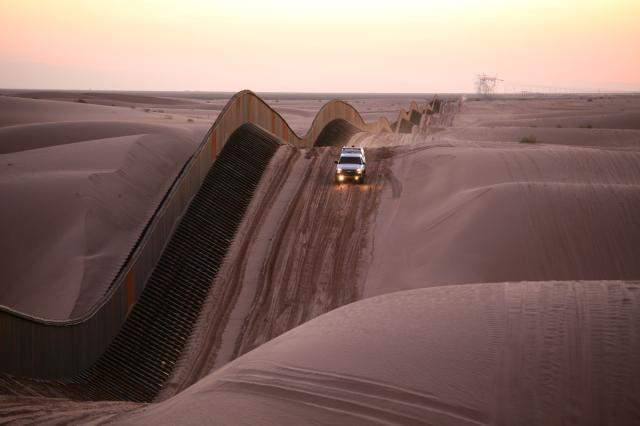
Mexico–United States barrier in California

Some walls formally mark the border between one population and another. A border wall is constructed to limit the movement of people across a certain line or border. These structures vary in placement with regard to international borders and topography. The most famous example of border barrier in history is probably the Great Wall of China, a series of walls that separated the Empire of China from nomadic powers to the north. The most prominent recent example is the Berlin Wall, which surrounded the enclave of West Berlin and separated it from East Germany for most of the Cold War era. The US-Mexico border wall, separating the United States and Mexico, is another recent example.

== Retaining wall ==
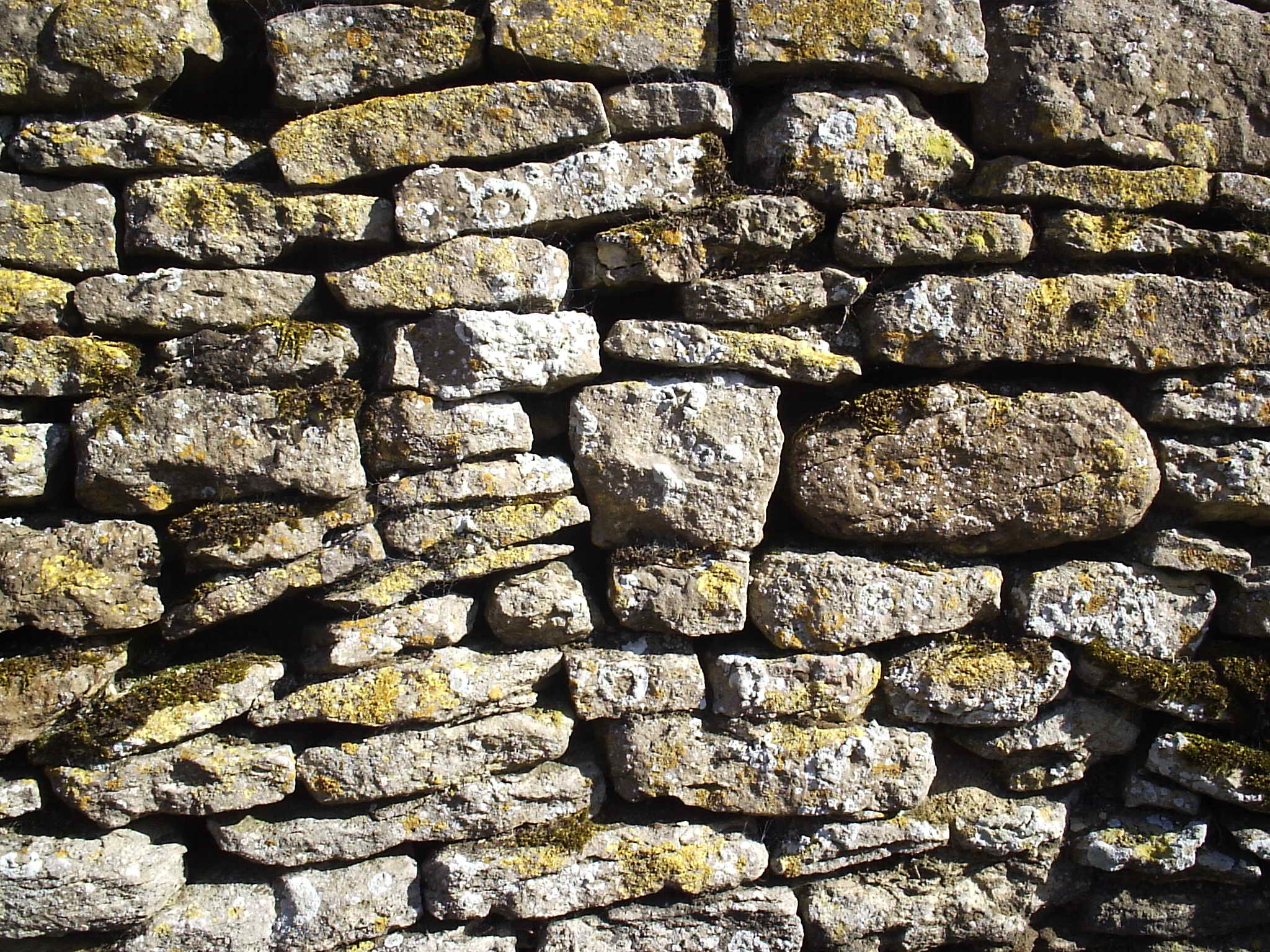
Dry-stone wall, Grendon

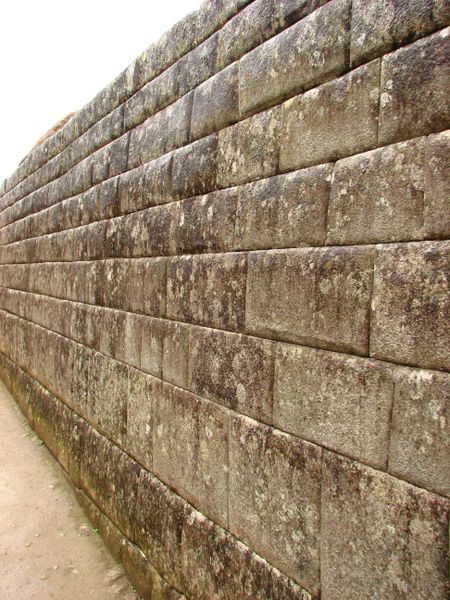
Ashlar wall: Inca wall at Machu Picchu, Peru

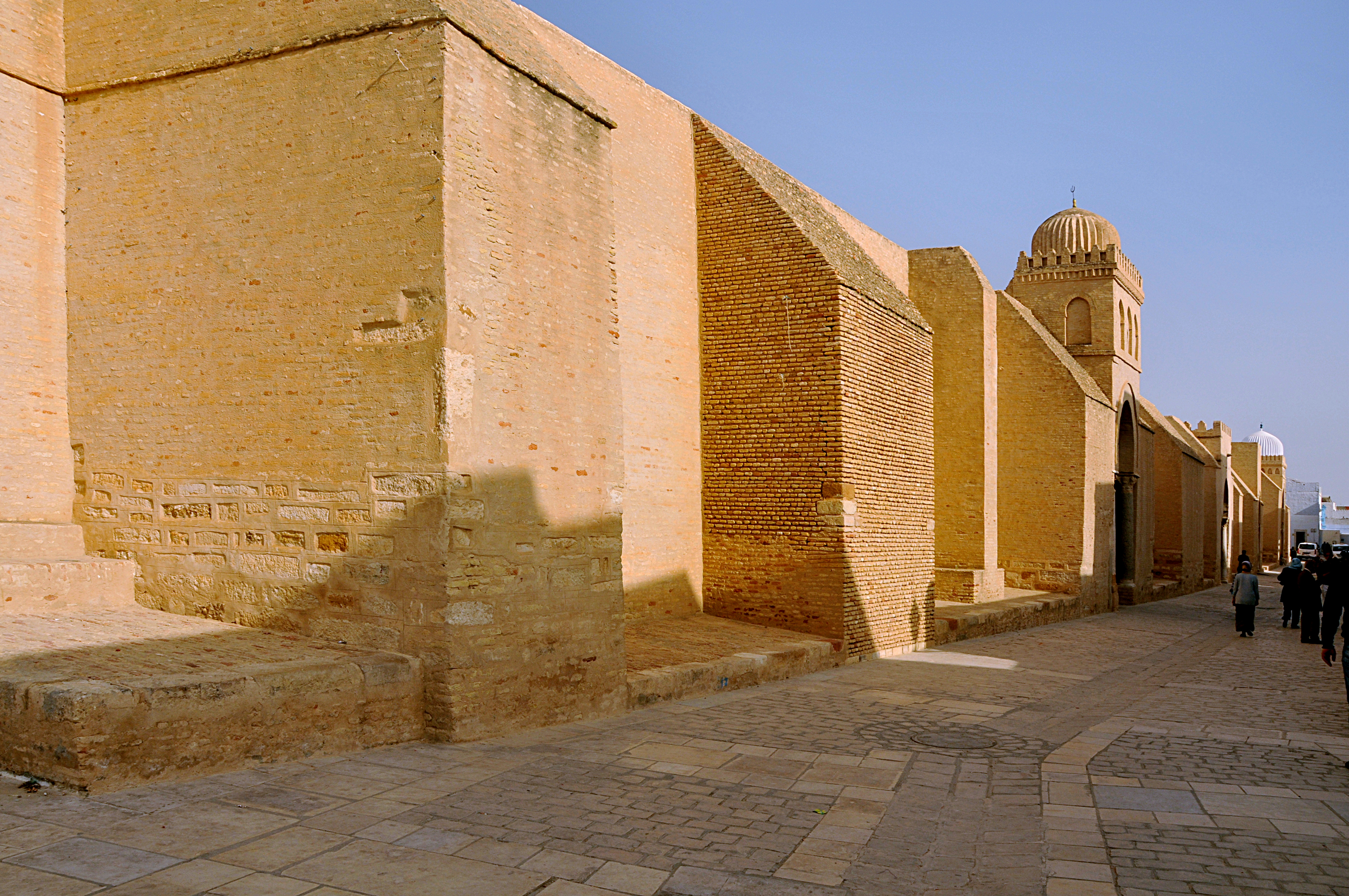
View of the western enclosing wall of the Great Mosque of Kairouan (also called the Mosque of Uqba) in the city of Kairouan in Tunisia

In areas of rocky soils around the world, farmers have often pulled large quantities of stone out of their fields to make farming easier and have stacked those stones to make walls that either mark the field boundary, or the property boundary, or both.

Retaining walls resist movement of earth, stone, or water. They may be part of a building or external. The ground surface or water on one side of a retaining wall is typically higher than on the other side. A dike is a retaining wall, as is a levee, a load-bearing foundation wall, and a sea wall.

== Shared wall ==
Special laws often govern walls that neighbouring properties share. Typically, one neighbour cannot alter the common wall if it is likely to affect the building or property on the other side. A wall may also separate apartment or hotel rooms from each other. Each wall has two sides and breaking a wall on one side will break the wall on the other side.

== Portable wall ==
Portable walls, such as room dividers or portable partitions divide a larger open space into smaller rooms. Portable walls can be static, such as cubicle walls, or can be wall panels mounted on casters to provide an easy way to reconfigure assembly space. They are often found inside schools, churches, convention centers, hotels, and corporate facilities.

== Temporary wall ==
A temporary wall is constructed for easy removal or demolition. A typical temporary wall can be constructed with 1/2 in (13 mm) to 5/8 in (16 mm) sheet rock (plasterboard), metal 2 × 3 s (1 1/2 in × 2 1/2 in, 38 mm × 64 mm) or 2 × 4 s (1 1/2 in × 3 1/2 in, 38 mm × 89 mm), or taped, plastered and compounded. Most installation companies use lattice (strips of wood) to cover the joints of the temporary wall with the ceiling. These are sometimes known as pressurized walls or temporary pressurized walls.

== Walls in popular culture ==
Walls are often seen in popular culture, oftentimes representing barriers preventing progress or entry. For example:

Fictional and symbolic walls

The progressive/psychedelic rock band Pink Floyd used a metaphorical wall to represent the isolation felt by the protagonist of their 1979 concept album The Wall.

The American poet laureate Robert Frost describes a pointless rock wall as a metaphor for the myopia of the culture-bound in his poem "Mending Wall", published in 1914.

Walls are a recurring symbol in Ursula K. Le Guin's 1974 novel The Dispossessed.

In some cases, a wall may refer to an individual's debilitating mental or physical condition, seen as an impassable barrier.

In George R. R. Martin's A Song of Ice and Fire series and its television adaptation, Game of Thrones, The Wall plays multiple important roles: as a colossal fortification, made of ice and fortified with magic spells; as a cultural barrier; and as a codification of assumptions. Breaches of the wall, who is allowed to cross it and who is not, and its destruction have important symbolic, logistical, and socio-political implications in the storyline. Reportedly over 700 feet (210 m) high and 100 leagues (300 mi; 480 km) wide, it divides the northern border of the Seven Kingdoms realm from the domain of the wildlings and several categories of undead who live beyond it.

Historical walls

In a real-life example, the Berlin Wall, constructed by the Soviet Union to divide Berlin into NATO and Warsaw Pact zones of occupation, became a worldwide symbol of oppression and isolation.

Social media walls

Another common usage is as a communal surface to write upon. For instance the social networking site Facebook previously used an electronic "wall" to log the scrawls of friends until it was replaced by the "timeline" feature.

== See also ==
- Ashlar
- Chemise (wall)
- Clay panel
- Climbing wall
- Crinkle crankle wall
- Fabric structure
- Great Green Wall (Africa)
- Great Green Wall (China)
- Green wall
- List of walls
- Sleeper wall
- Stone wall
- Tensile structure
- Terraced wall
- Thin-shell structure
- Wallpaper
