= Portable partition =

Form of temporary wall

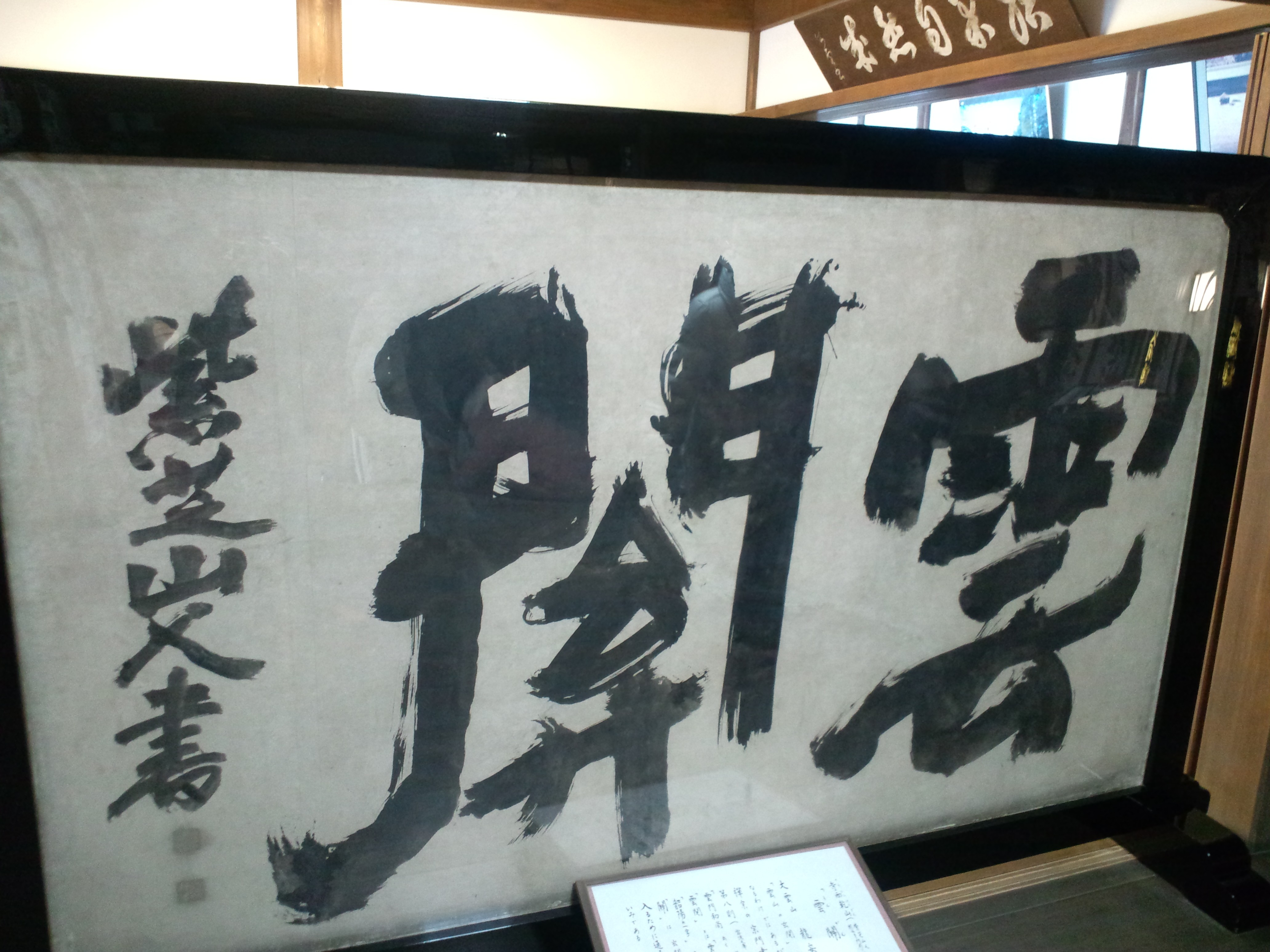

Portable partitions are a form of temporary walls which serve to divide rooms in place of permanent walls. They can be joined together section by section, or available as one unit, depending on the manufacturer. Portable walls may be fixed, or on casters for rolling, while others may be folding room dividers, inflatable, or accordion-style.

== Function and uses ==
Portable walls are not generally anchored to a floor or ceiling, unlike suspended accordion room dividers, and drapes, pipe and drape. They are different from traditional office cubicles in that portable walls often serve a temporary function rather than a permanent workspace, such as use for art exhibits, classrooms, triage areas, trade show display, and similar uses.

Depending on the manufacturer, portable walls portable walls may be stacked, folded, or on wheels, enabling mobility and ease of storage. The portable wall partition has two full panel end members which provide support, rigidity, privacy. Some provide noise reduction.

Portable partitions are used to divide space quickly where non-mobile permanent room dividers may be unavailable or impracticable. They may also be used as a convenient sight divider to conceal door openings to restrooms, commercial kitchens and other backroom areas.

Operable partitions or folding partition walls involve a series of interlocking panels suspended from an overhead track. When extended they utilize seals at the floor, wall, and ceiling to provide acoustical separation. When retracted they stack against a wall, ceiling, closet, or ceiling pocket.

== See also ==
- Folding screen, a piece of furniture
- Fusuma
- Tsuitate
