= Tsuitate =

Traditional Japanese single-panel portable partition

A tsuitate (衝立) is a form of single-panel portable partition traditionally used in Japan since at least the 6th century. They may be made of wood, or a wood frame covered in paper or silk cloth. The panels are often illustrated, with paintings on both sides, sometimes by well-known artists. The wood frame may be lacquered, and pricier tsuitate may be very richly decorated, including use of precious metals.

Apart from their use as works of art, they are often used to screen entrances, and block wind and sun They may also partition rooms, divide the public part of a shop from the residential area behind, and act as a signboard.

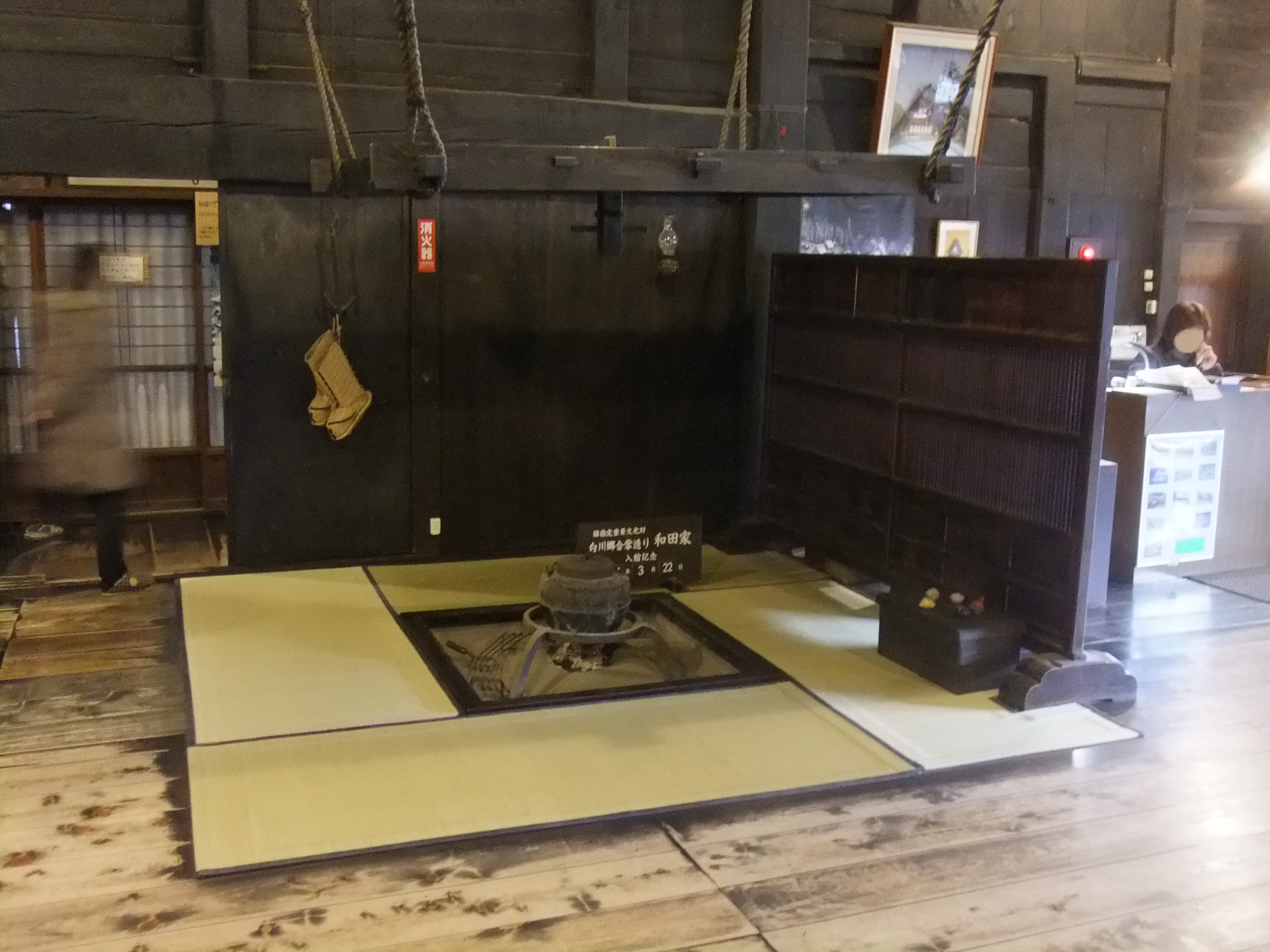
A robust all-wood tsuitate, screening a fire from drafts in a rural house (history exhibit)

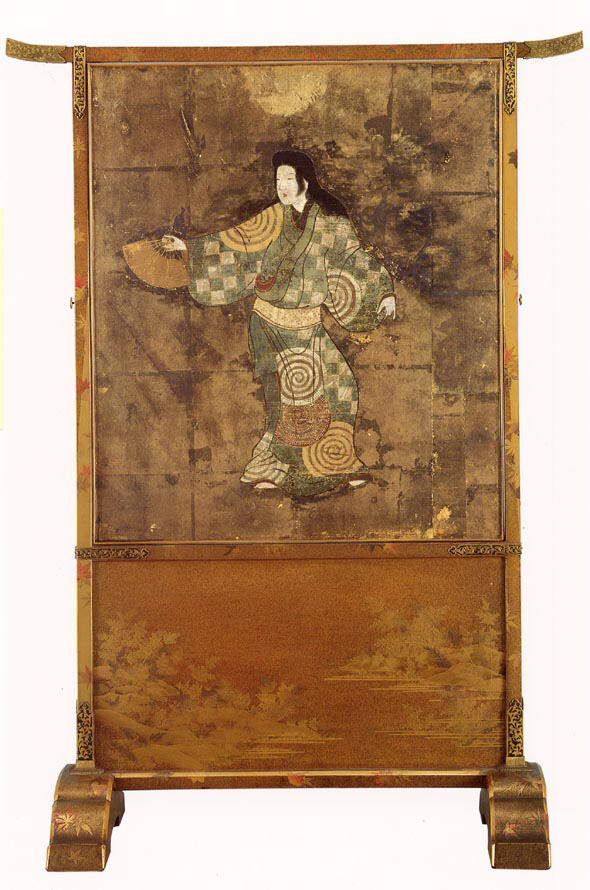
A tall 1700s tsuitate, presumably a replica konmeichi screen

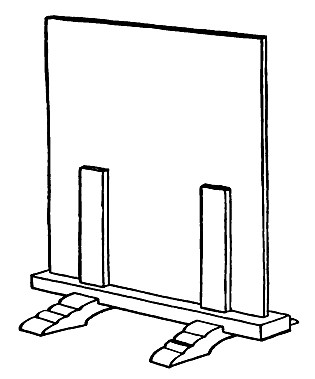
Tsuitate could be made in one piece, or as here, with a separate stand and panel.

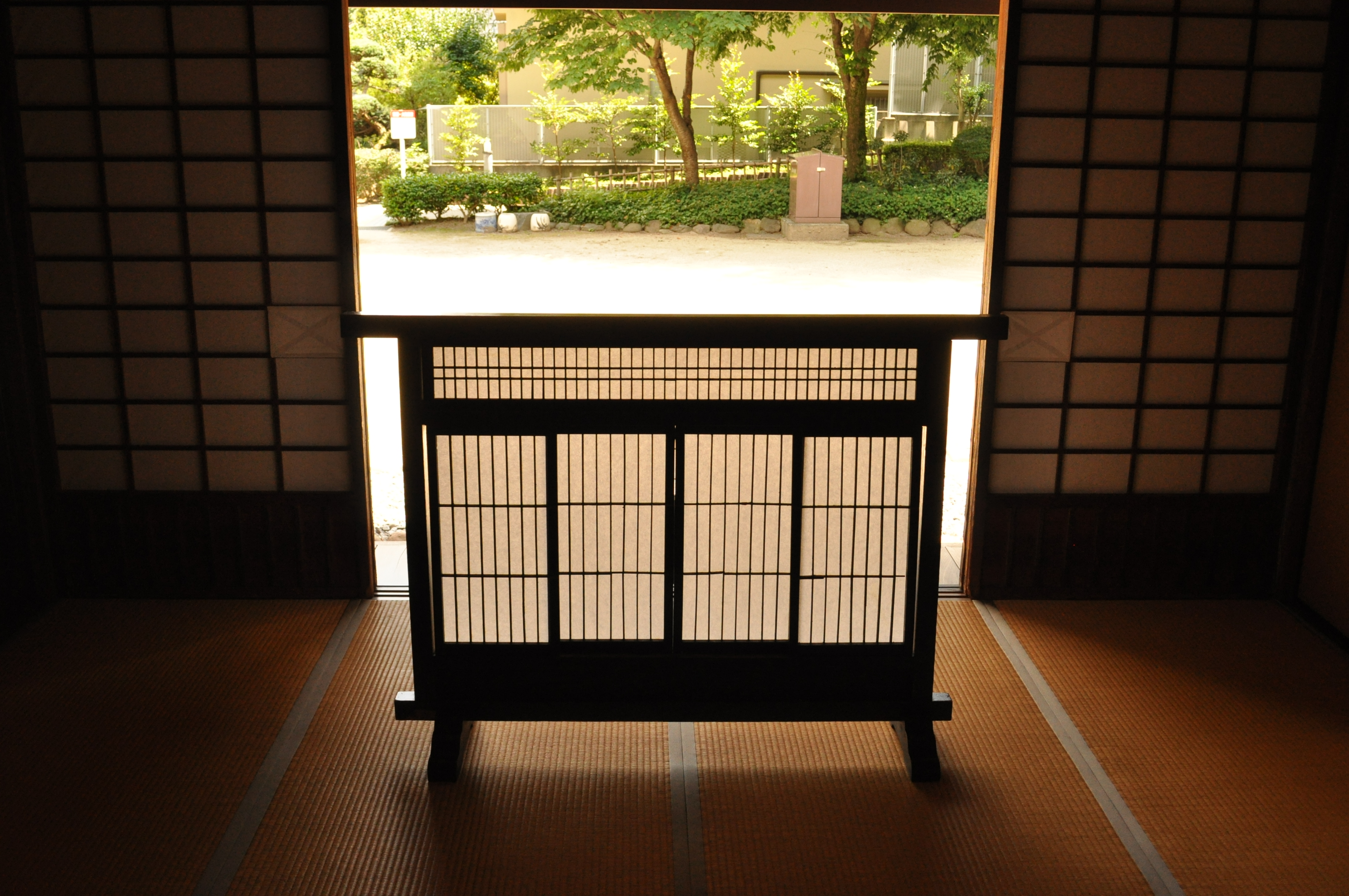
Tsuitate are traditionally used to screen entrances.

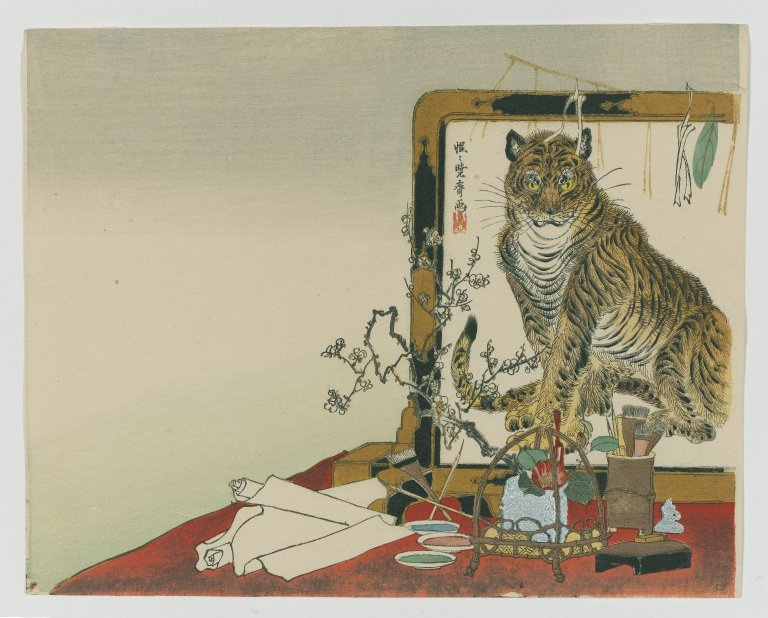
A print of a painting by Kawanabe Kyōsai, depicting a tsuitate screen painted by Kyōsai, complete with his signature on the screen
