= Room divider =

Furniture used to divide a room

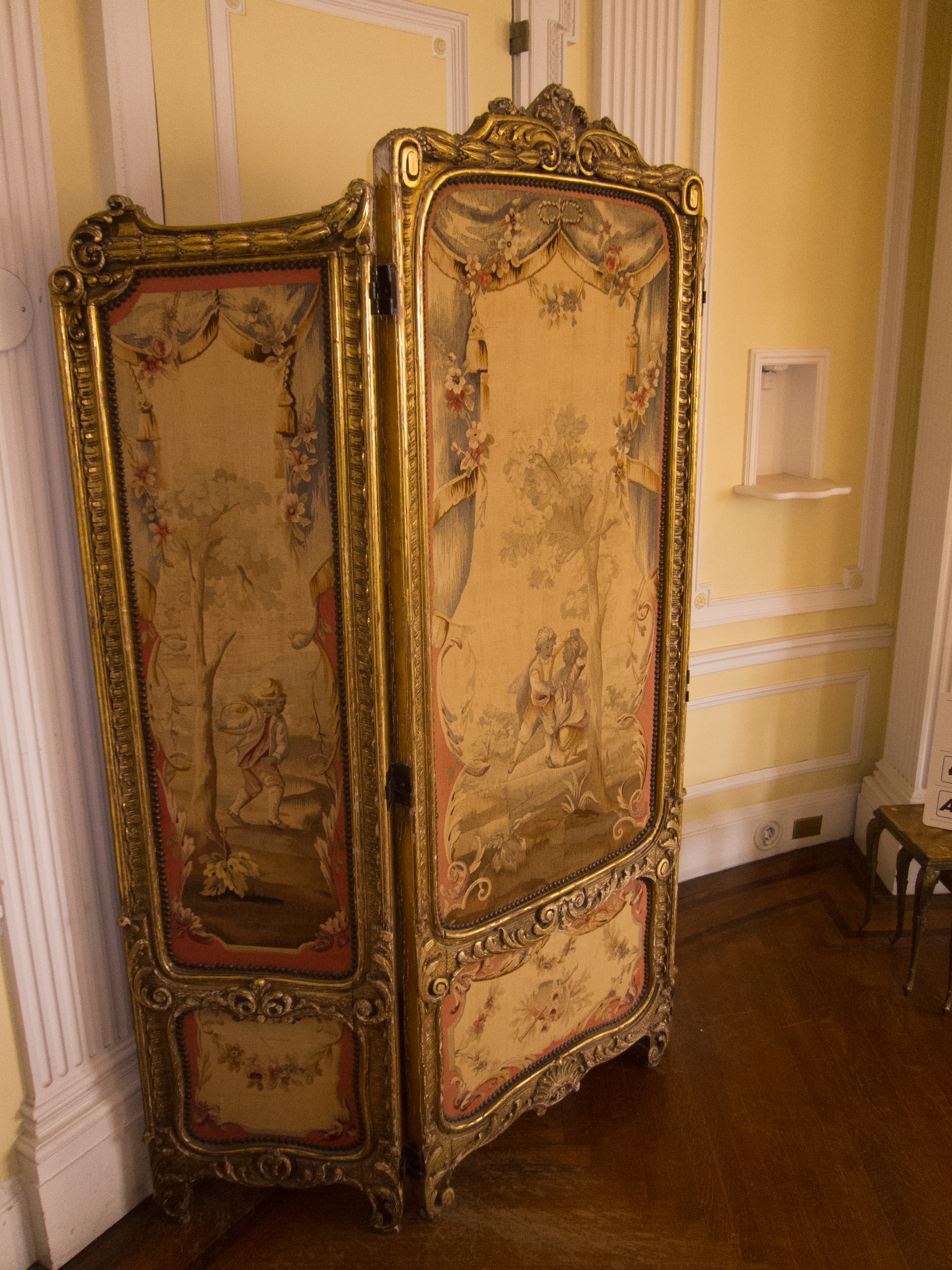
Casa Loma, Toronto, Ontario, Canada

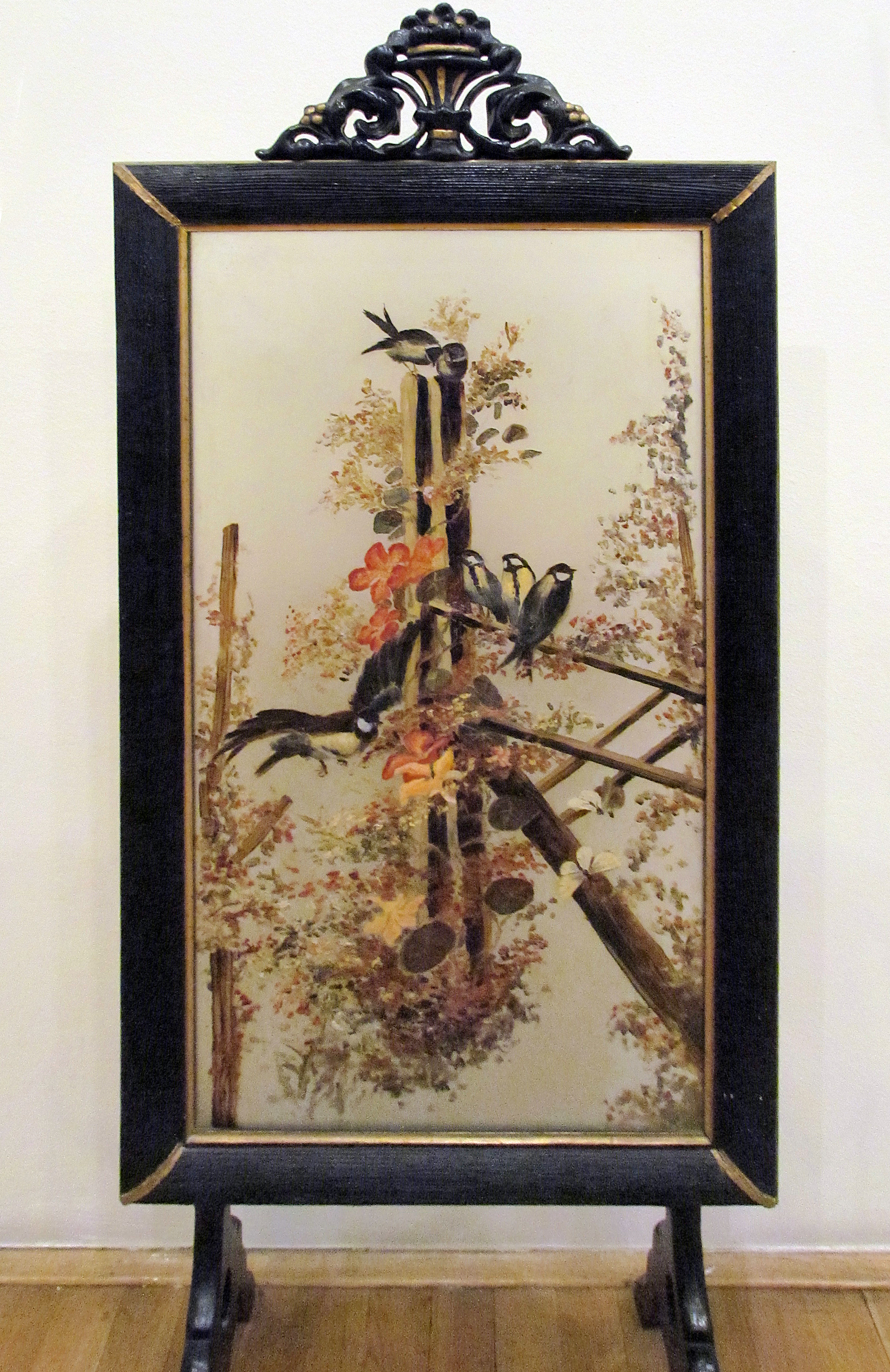
Room-divider/screen, (Ethnographic Museum, Belgrade)

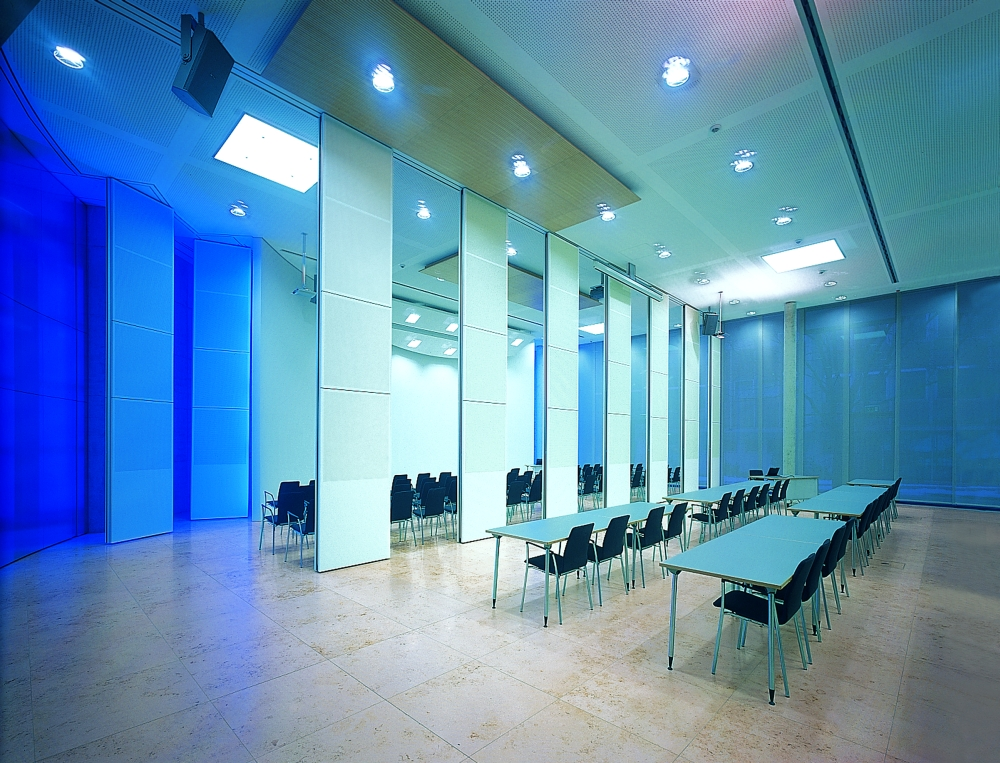
A room divider for a conference hall.

A room divider is a screen or piece of furniture placed in a way that divides a room into separate areas. Room dividers are used by interior designers and architects as means to divide space into separate distinct areas.

There are a number of different types of room dividers such as cubicle partitions, pipe and drape screens, shoji screens, and walls. Room dividers can be made from many materials, including wood, fabric, plexiglass, framed cotton canvas, pleated fabric or mirrors. Plants, shelves or railings might also be used as dividers. Portable room dividers have folded wall panels supported on wheels.

== History ==
The folding room screens were found in China in the 7th century where they were mainly used by royalty. They were very heavy and ornate, and were not moved around. In the 8th century, the Japanese began using lighter, more portable room dividers for tea ceremonies, religious events and outdoor processions. European travelers developed their own version of Asian screen dividers using wood, leather, silk, mirrors and decoupage.

== Types ==
In general, room dividers are used in one of these ways:

- To divide rooms, creating a more efficient use of the space within the room.
- As decorators and/or accent pieces to add character to room space.
- To hide areas of different usage or privacy protection
- To decorate rooms for better home design effect

Room dividers differ in nature being either:

- Permanent as in using wine shelves in restaurants
- Built in as in sliding partitions in offices
- Portable or temporary as for example in convention centers
- Fixed room dividers and hanging room dividers

They may completely obscure as in floor to ceiling dividers, or may allow sight through as for example when plant pots are used to divide areas.

== Uses ==
Folding room dividers are now used in dwellings, hospitals, schools, restaurants, corporate offices, and convention centers. Houses, and other residences, use a room divider to divide the space more effectively or as a decorating focus point. There are many uses for a room divider including: dividing the room, adding privacy to any space, hiding clutter and increasing storage and accents to the room. Other uses include adding color, redirecting foot traffic, creating a foyer, adding a desk front modesty screen, creating coziness, or adding a decorative background.

Most commonly used in the residence is a small room divider, sometimes called a folding shoji screen. Shoji screens are usually tri-fold walls. A shoji screen may also be used to section off part of a bedroom or family room as an office. Plants, bookshelves, railings, fireplaces, light fixtures, and drapes have all been used to effectively create distinct spaces in individuals apartments and homes.

In schools or religious facilities, room dividers primarily are used to create temporary classrooms for education in large open rooms. Since the rooms were designed originally to be open for other purposes, the most common type of room divider is a portable room divider on casters which can easily be moved from place to place. After class, the room divider is rolled back into its storage area for future use.

Hotels and restaurants use two different types of room dividers. Commonly, you will see floor-to-ceiling room dividers in banquet halls and meeting spaces. These fixed dividers can be used to divide a banquet room into smaller facilities. In areas where room dividers need more flexibility, hotels and restaurants might use portable partitions similar to those used in schools.

In offices, room dividers are typically more permanent in nature and attached directly to the floor. These office cubicles room dividers allow taking a large office space and breaking it into quieter and more focused subdivided offices.

Convention centers, by their very nature, are large facilities with wide open internal spaces. Consequently, they often need to be broken down into smaller areas. The most common room divider used in convention center is pipe and drape. The convention center sets up frames made of plastic, metal, or wire tubing. Fabric material is then hung over the frame to create back drops and hide other unsightly places in addition to creating multiple subdivided rooms.

== See also ==
- Folding screen
- Pipe and drape
