= Pressurized wall =

Pressurized walls are a type of wall that is installed without the use of nails or screws. The term is frequently used interchangeably with "temporary walls", "flex walls" and "partition walls" to refer to walls that can be installed and removed without modifying or damaging the existing property.

They may be built using sheetrock 1/2" (6 mm) to 5/8" (16 mm) sheet rock (plasterboard), metal 2 × 3s (approx. 5 × 7 cm) or 2 × 4s, or taped, plastered and compounded. Most installation companies utilize lattice strips of wood to cover the joints of the above drywall. After the frame-out process, 1 1/4" (32 mm) sheet rock screws are used to attach the drywall to the pressurized 2×4s that contact the floor, the ceiling and the sides of the property's walls. In order to prevent structural or architectural damage, only T-nuts and leveling screw pads are used on those studs. No additional fasteners or adhesives are used to add stability to the frame work.

Generally, hollow core doors or French style doors are recommended to prevent weight overload and/or shifting of a pressurized wall. Completed walls are often painted the same color as existing walls. With the development of technologies, pressurized walls and temporary walls in general are getting more and more stable and reliable. Many landlords used to allow tenants to construct pressurized walls as long as they remove the walls before vacating the apartment. As a result, pressurized walls became especially popular in New York City, where the high cost of real estate leads many tenants to use such walls to create extra bedrooms, home offices or walk-in closets.

In mid-2010, New York City authorities started demanding that such walls be removed because they contravene building codes and can pose safety hazards. However, no local law has been passed banning the use/installation/leasing of these pressurized walls a.k.a. pressurized partitions as the gray area has not been clearly defined by the 2008 printed/issued NYC Building Code.
