= Pipe and drape =

Interior decoration

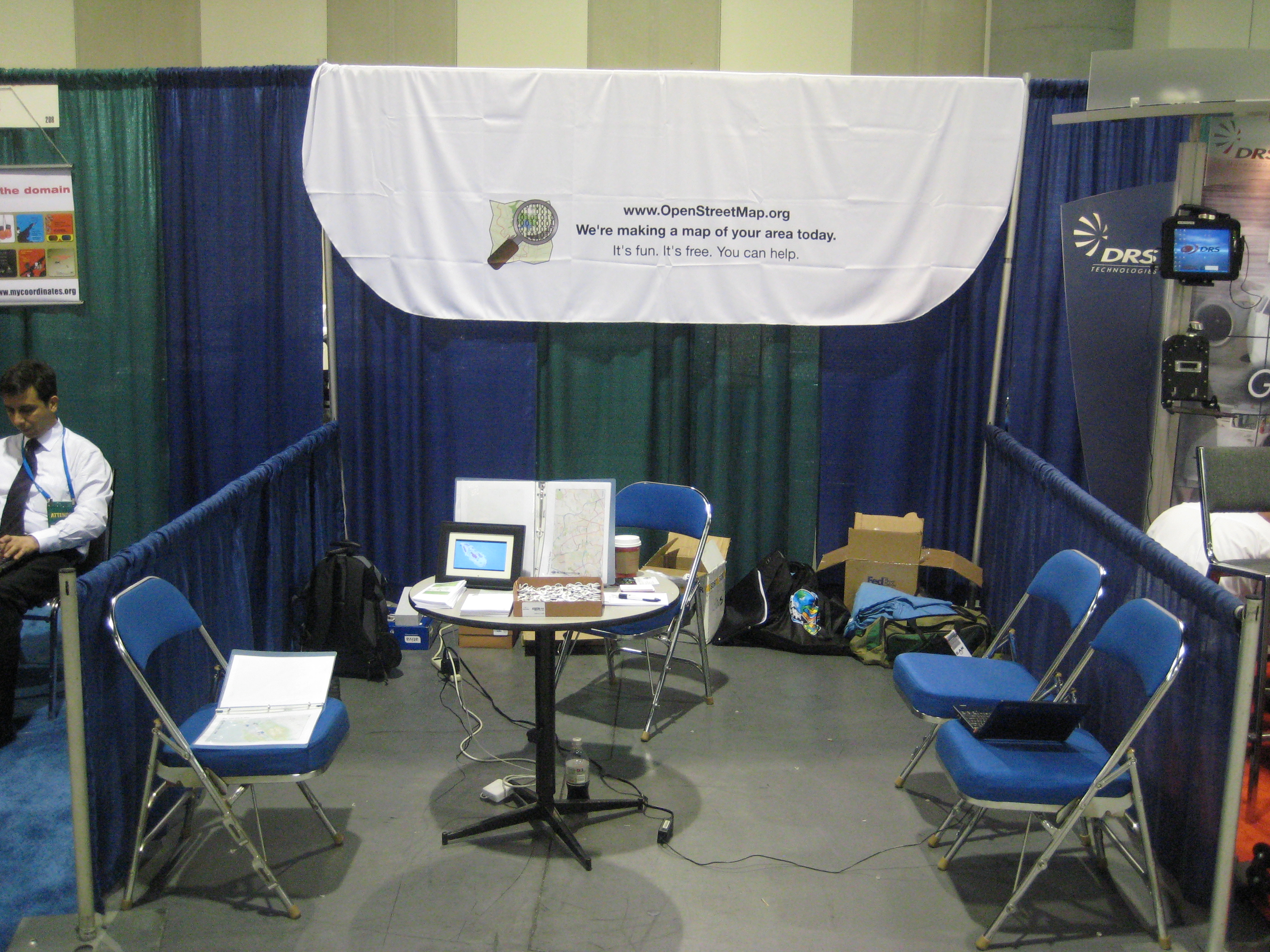
A trade show booth using pipe and drape

Pipe and drape is a style of freestanding panelling used to divide, hide, and/or decorate a space temporarily. The structure consists of aluminum or steel piping fixed or adjustable telescoping vertical uprights supported by a weighted steel base, and adjustable telescopic or fixed horizontals that provide a drape support frame with removable drape panels.

When the system is used for exhibition purposes and used instead of the traditional shell scheme option, build time and breakdown time is significantly reduced. Pipe and drape is a way of adding colour to what would normally be a plain backdrop.

Often used in trade show booths, in tents, in large banquet halls, and on stage, pipe and drape covers up the distracting features of the less appealing wall or window behind it. Pipe and drape is freestanding, so it can be used as a room divider, exhibition curtain backdrape, a stage theatrical backdrop, a catering aisle drape, or drape partitions.

Pipe and drape is used frequently with home staging, weddings, fashion shows, concerts, interior design, in the theatre, and on-set in television programs and movies.

== Drapes ==
Drape must be "pleated" or installed with folds for a finished look. Typically 1.5-ft to 2.0 ft of drape is used for each running foot to be covered. The industry standard fabric for trade show drapery is Banjo. Banjo is a dobby-weave fabric made from a medium-sheen polyester yarn. It is inherently flame resistant and machine washable. Inherent flame resistance means the flame retardant characteristics will not fade with washing. Booths require two different sizes of drape: 8’ long drape which hangs between 8’ high uprights and 3’ long drape which hangs between 3’ uprights and the 3’ slot on 8’ uprights.

The industry standard for trade show drapery is for the drapes to be two inches shorter than the height of the upright. A typical 8’ Banjo drape is actually 94” in finished height with 4” pockets on top and bottom. This prevents the drape from hanging on the floor and allows the panel to be flipped over when the bottom is soiled or damaged.

== Construction ==
The simplest and most common method of hanging drape panels is using a pipe pocket where the drape is simply sleeved over the pipe.

Uprights, as noted, are typically aluminum tubing, fixed or telescopic, with heights from 3’ to 26’. Fixed Uprights refer to one piece vertical pipes that cannot break down in to smaller sections or otherwise adjust in height. Telescopic Uprights refer to two piece vertical pipes that are adjustable in height between a designated range (for example, 6 feet to 10 feet tall), allowing for more versatility if different events require varying heights.

Uprights are supported by steel bases weighing from 6 to 62 lb. The ground support system is enhanced by the addition of sand bags or stage weights added to further counterbalance the height and weight of the drapes hung on the pipe system.

The horizontals can also be fixed or telescopic. Fixed horizontal supports range from 1’ to 10’, whereas a telescopic drape support, also known as a slider, can range from 2’-3’ to 9’-16’.

Horizontal supports are held in place by small metal hooks permanently mounted to each end of the pipe. The hooks are then placed into a slot on the upright and held in place by gravity, thereby making the pipe and drape support system.

In order to create longer, wider walls of pipe and drape, multiple sections of drape and horizontals are lined up by the uprights having multiple slots and the horizontals going in two opposite directions. Thus, sequential sections of pipe and drape panels make up the wall of drape.

Another method of hanging drape is using a theatrical tie-on method. Drape tie methods used may be a standard grommet and tie, where the tie and grommet hole are visible unless a clove hitch is used, and once tied, the drape ties must be rolled to hide the ties from the audience side of the drape.

Blind ties are another drape top finish that allows for drapes to be tied to a pipe without the audience seeing the grommets and ties.

Just like uprights and horizontals, drape panels come in any number of heights, widths, colors, and types of fabric. Drape panels range from an affordable American polyester tradeshow drape known as Banjo to a thick, luxurious Broadway theatre-style Velour. Banjo is the most basic fabric typically used in single fabric widths added together to create fullness. Whereas, higher-quality fabrics are typically single fabric widths sewn together to create larger continuous drape panels that are made to be sleeved on a single horizontal.

The use of Pipe and Drape to temporarily alter the look of a space continues to be a common, practical method.

== See also ==
- Kichō
